= Icelandic Air Policing =

Ongoing NATO operation

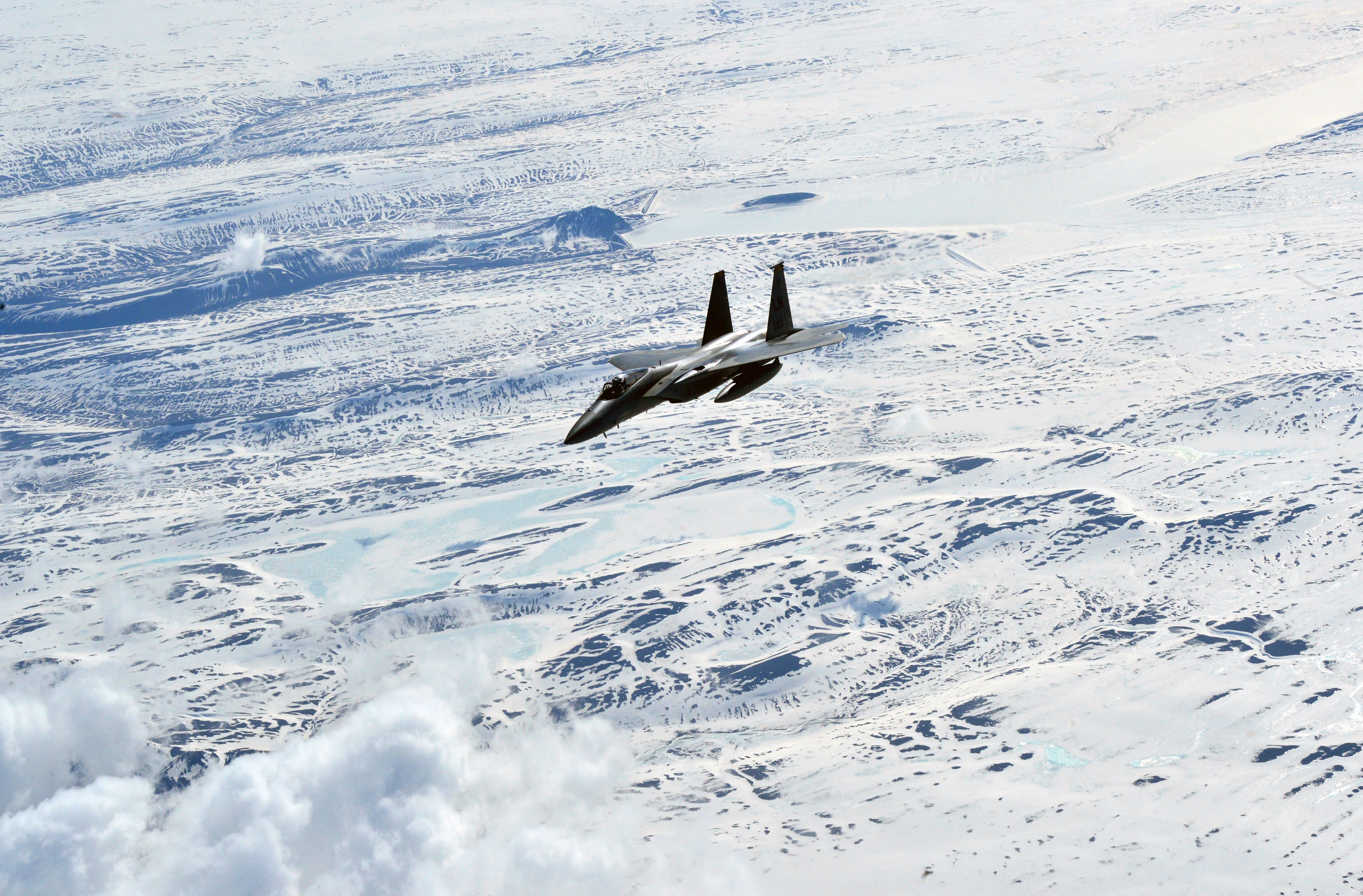
- A USAF F-15C Eagle fighter flying over Iceland during an Icelandic Air Policing patrol in April 2015
- Location: Iceland
- Objective: Regular patrols of Icelandic airspace
- Date: Periodically since May 2008
- Executed by: NATO
- Outcome: Ongoing

Icelandic Air Policing is a NATO operation conducted to patrol Iceland's airspace. As Iceland does not have an air force, in 2006 it requested that its NATO allies periodically deploy fighter aircraft to Keflavik Air Base to provide protection of its airspace. The first deployment of aircraft took place in May 2008.

== Background ==
As Iceland does not maintain an air force, the country was left without means to patrol its airspace when the United States Air Force (USAF) ceased deploying fighter units to Keflavik Air Base in September 2006, and the U.S. Iceland Defense Force was withdrawn. Following the American withdrawal Russian Air Force 37th Air Army aircraft entered Icelandic airspace on several occasions.

Prime Minister Geir Haarde requested that Iceland's NATO allies assume responsibility for protecting Iceland's airspace during the Riga Summit in November 2006. The North Atlantic Council agreed to this request at its July 2007 meeting. The other NATO member states who lack the ability to patrol their own airspace have similar arrangements in place. In March 2008, Prime Minister Haarde denied that the air policing operation was targeting Russian aircraft, and stated that "It is going to be a general patrolling exercise. We consider Russia to be our friends, by the way."

In contrast with the Baltic Air Policing mission, which involves the continuous presence of fighter aircraft from NATO countries at Šiauliai International Airport in Lithuania and Ämari Air Base in Estonia, the Icelandic government requested that NATO not maintain a permanent force at Keflavik. Instead, an average of three deployments are made per year, with each lasting from three to four weeks. Most deployments involve four fighter aircraft, though the number varies with some being larger.

As of January 2013, NATO had re-designated the deployments to Iceland as being the "Airborne Surveillance and Interception Capabilities to meet Iceland's Peacetime Preparedness Needs" mission, and emphasised to reporters that it was focused on training rather than air policing.

Since 2014 the aircraft deployed to Iceland have been placed on Quick Reaction Alert (QRA) status and flown armed patrols. While these tasks were not previously undertaken, it was decided to commence them in response to the deterioration in relations between Russia and NATO countries following the annexation of Crimea by the Russian Federation and the war in Donbas.

In 2018, the deployments to Iceland came under the Allied Air Command and were controlled by NATO's northern Combined Air Operations Centre at Uedem in Germany. The Combined Air Operations Centre manages NATO air policing north of the Alps, including by controlling the Baltic Air Policing operation.

In March 2022 it was reported that the Icelandic government was considering whether a continuous air policing presence was required due to the increased threat resulting from the Russian invasion of Ukraine. Formal discussions of the matter had not yet taken place.

In February 2026 NATO initiated the Arctic Sentry initiative to strengthen its activities in the Arctic and high north regions. The Icelandic Air Policing mission is a major element of Arctic Sentry.

== Deployments ==
The following deployments have been made to Iceland:

Dates	Nationality	Air Force	Unit	Aircraft	Notes	Reference
5 May – 30 June 2008	France	French Air Force	EC 01.002 Cigognes	4 x Mirage 2000-5F	Deployment had a strength of 110 personnel	
September 2008	United States	United States Air Force	48th Fighter Wing	4 x F-15C Eagle		
4 - 30 March 2009	Denmark	Royal Danish Air Force	727 squadron, 730 squadron and Air Control Wing.	4 x F-16AM Fighting Falcon	48 personnel deployed	
? 2009	Norway	Royal Norwegian Air Force	338 skv & 331 skv	4 x F-16AM Fighting Falcon		
? 2009	United States	United States Air Force	?	?		
1 – 31 March 2010	Denmark	Royal Danish Air Force	727 squadron, 730 squadron and Air Control Wing.	4 x F-16AM Fighting Falcon	This deployment included two ground intercept controllers from the Estonian Defence Forces.	
1 – 25 June 2010	Germany	German Air Force	Jagdgeschwader 71	6 x F-4F Phantom II		
6 – 24 September 2010	United States	United States Air Force	493rd Expeditionary Fighter Squadron, 48th Fighter Wing	8 x F-15C Eagle	About 200 personnel deployed	
28 March – 30 April 2011	Canada	Royal Canadian Air Force	409 Tactical Fighter Squadron	5 x CF-18 Hornet	About 140 personnel deployed	
? 2011	Norway	Royal Norwegian Air Force	331 skv	4 x F-16AM Fighting Falcon		
? 2011	United States	United States Air Force	?			
5 March – 2 April 2012	Germany	German Air Force	Jagdgeschwader 71	6 x F-4F Phantom II		
1 May – 7 June 2012	United States	United States Air Force	493rd Expeditionary Fighter Squadron	4 X F-15C Eagle	1 x KC-135 Stratotanker & 1 x C-130J Hercules supported deployment	
7 August–20 September 2012	Portugal	Portuguese Air Force	201 and 301 Squadrons	6 x F-16AM Fighting Falcon	Detachment had a strength of 70 military personnel	
18 March – 28 April 2013	Canada	Royal Canadian Air Force	425 Tactical Fighter Squadron	6 x CF-18 Hornet	Detachment consisted of 1 x CC-150 Polaris & 160 Canadian Forces personnel	
7 June – 10 July 2013	Italy	Italian Air Force	4° Stormo - 9° Gruppo	6 x Eurofighter Typhoon	2 x KC-767, 1 x C-130J Super Hercules and about 150 personnel deployed	
November 2013	United States	United States Air Force	493rd Expeditionary Fighter Squadron, 48th Air Expeditionary Group	6 x F-15C Eagle	2 x Boeing KC-135 Stratotanker personnel deployed	
27 January – 21 February 2014	Norway	Royal Norwegian Air Force	338 skv & 331 skv	6 x F-16AM Fighting Falcon	About 110 personnel deployed	
16 May – 5 June 2014	United States	United States Air Force	48th Air Expeditionary Group	6 x F-15C Eagle	1 x Boeing KC-135 Stratotanker & about 200 personnel deployed	
10 October – 3 December 2014	Czech Republic	Czech Air Force	211th Tactical Squadron	5 x JAS 39C Gripen	75 personnel deployed	
17 April 2015 –	United States	United States Air Force	871st Air Expeditionary Squadron	4 x F-15C Eagle	1 x Boeing KC-135 Stratotanker and about 200 personnel deployed	
27 July – 28 August 2015	Czech Republic	Czech Air Force	211th Tactical Squadron	5 x JAS 39C Gripen	The detachment conducted 91 sorties, and included 8 pilots and 60 other personnel.	
31 August – 1 October 2015	Denmark	Royal Danish Air Force	?	4 x F-16AM Fighting Falcon	Detachment had a strength of 60 personnel	
4–28 April 2016	United States	Massachusetts Air National Guard	131st Fighter Squadron	4 x F-15C Eagle	1 x Boeing KC-135 Stratotanker and about 160 personnel deployed	
30 May 2016 – ??	Norway	Royal Norwegian Air Force	?	4 x F-16AM Fighting Falcon	4 weeks June 2016 / About 80 personnel deployed	
5 October – late October 2016	Czech Republic	Czech Air Force	211th Tactical Squadron	5 x JAS 39C Gripen	75 personnel deployed	
16 March – 14 April 2017	Italy	Italian Air Force	4° Stormo	6 x Eurofighter Typhoon	145 personnel deployed for 3.011 million Euro	
18 May – Mid-June 2017	Canada	Royal Canadian Air Force	433 Tactical Fighter Squadron	6 x CF-18 Hornet	Detachment consisted of 154 personnel	
23 August – Late September 2017	United States	Florida Air National Guard	159th Expeditionary Fighter Squadron	6 x F-15C Eagle	1 x KC-135, 1 x KC-10 aircraft and personnel from both the Louisiana and Florida Air National Guard. Detachment included approximately 280 personnel.	
14 April 2018 - 30 May 2018	Denmark	Royal Danish Air Force	Esk 730	4 x F-16AM Fighting Falcon	Approximately 60 personnel	
30 July - 31 August 2018	United States	United States Air Force	493rd Expeditionary Fighter Squadron	14 x F-15C Eagle	Included 300 personnel	
4 September – 5 October 2018	Italy	Italian Air Force	37° Stormo - 18° Gruppo	4 x Eurofighter Typhoon	120 personnel deployed	
11 March 2019 – 11 April 2019	Italy	Italian Air Force	36° Stormo - 10° Gruppo & 12° Gruppo	4 x Eurofighter Typhoon	130 personnel deployed	
29 July - 10 August 2019	United States	United States Air Force	480th Fighter Squadron	5 x F-16C	Over 100 personnel deployed	
1 – 25 October 2019	Italy	Italian Air Force	32° Stormo - 13° Gruppo	6 x F-35A Lightning II	F-35's first Icelandic Air Policing deployment. 1 x KC-767 supported deployment	
13 November – 10 December 2019	United Kingdom	Royal Air Force	No. 1 Squadron	4 x Eurofighter Typhoon	Approximately 100 personnel	
21 February – March 2020	Norway	Royal Norwegian Air Force	332 Squadron	4 x F-35A Lightning II	130 military and civilian personnel	
9 June – mid-July 2020	Italy	Italian Air Force	32° Stormo - 13° Gruppo	6 x F-35A Lightning II	135 military personnel	
13 October 2020 - ?	United States	United States Air Force	493rd Expeditionary Fighter Squadron, 48th Fighter Wing	3 x F-15C Eagle & 1 x F-15D Eagle	F-15C s/n 84-0010 wore D-Day 75th Anniversary heritage markings.	
22 February – 5 March 2021	Norway	Royal Norwegian Air Force	332 Squadron	4 x F-35A Lightning II	130 military personnel	
July 2021	United States	United States Air Force	493rd Fighter Squadron, 48th Fighter Wing	3 x F-15C Eagle, 1 x F-15E Strike Eagle		
5 August 2021 – 10 October 2021	Poland	Polish Air Force	32nd Air Base	4 x General Dynamics F-16 Fighting Falcon	140 personnel	
1 February – 30 March 2022	Portugal	Portuguese Air Force	301 Squadron	4 x F-16AM Fighting Falcon	155 military personnel	
25 April – 4 July 2022	Italy	Italian Air Force	32° Stormo - 13° Gruppo	4 x F-35A Lightning II; 2 x F-35B Lightning II	130+ military personnel. F-35Bs deployed for one week; 1 x KC-767 & 1 x C-130J supported deployment.	
17 August 2022 – Mid-September 2022	Denmark	Royal Danish Air Force	Esk 727 & Esk 730	4 x F-16AM Fighting Falcon		
20 January 2023 – 9 February 2023	Norway	Royal Norwegian Air Force	332 Squadron	4 x F-35A Lightning II	Approximately 100 personnel	
22 October 2023 – 12 November 2023	United States	United States Air Force	480th Fighter Squadron	4 x F-16C	Approximately 100 personnel	
15 January – mid-February 2024	Norway	Royal Norwegian Air Force	331 Squadron	4 x F-35A Lightning II	Approximately 100 personnel	
3 June 2024 – 17 June 2024	United States	United States Air Force	492nd Fighter Squadron	4 x F-15E Strike Eagle	120 personnel	
5 August - 2 September 2024	United Kingdom	Royal Air Force	617 Squadron	4 x F-35B Lightning II	180 personnel	
January 2025 - February 2025	Finland	Finnish Air Force	11 Squadron	4 x F/A-18 Hornet	50 personnel	
31 May 2025 – July 2025	Czech Republic	Czech Air Force	211th Tactical Squadron	5 x JAS 39C Gripen	Approximately 95 personnel deployed	
22 July 2025 – 16 August 2025	Spain	Spanish Air Force	Ala 15 (15th Wing)	6 x EF-18 Hornet	Approximately 130 personnel deployed	
16 August 2025 – 15 September 2025	Belgium	Belgian Air Force	350th Fighter Squadron	4 x F-16AM Fighting Falcon	Approximately 100 personnel deployed	
Early February 2026 - Mid-March 2026	Sweden	Swedish Air Force	F 7 Skaraborg Wing	6 x JAS Gripen	Approximately 110 personnel deployed	
2 July 2026 - late July 2026	United Kingdom	Fleet Air Arm	809 Naval Air Squadron	F-35B Lightning IIs	Operating from HMS Prince of Wales	
7 August 2026 – early September 2026	Belgium	Belgian Air Force	350th Fighter Squadron (TBC)	4 x F-16AM Fighting Falcon	Approximately 100 personnel deployed	

A planned deployment of four British Royal Air Force Eurofighter Typhoons from No. 3 (F) Squadron in December 2008 was cancelled as a result of the Icesave dispute between Britain and Iceland. Poland also cancelled a planned deployment of F-16 fighters to Iceland in 2010 due to the impact of the 2008 financial crisis. As part of the terms of an agreement signed in March 2019 between the British and Icelandic governments, the RAF was scheduled to undertake an air policing deployment to Iceland in 2019.

Fighter aircraft deployed to Iceland are accompanied by NATO Boeing E-3 Sentry AWACS aircraft to enhance the Iceland Air Defence System radar network as well as other supporting aircraft as required.

In addition to the NATO deployments, fighter aircraft from Finland and Sweden have also undertaken training in Iceland before joining the alliance in 2023 and 2024 respectively.

== See also ==
- Baltic Air Policing
- NATO strategy in the Arctic
