= NATO Arctic Sentry =

Military mission

NATO Arctic Sentry is a military mission initiated in early 2026 by NATO, aiming to increase its presence in the Arctic, based on surveillance and military operations. The mission was launched on 11 February 2026 after there had been tensions between US president Trump and Denmark in the Greenland crisis.

== Background ==
Since the beginning of the 21st century, the Arctic's strategic importance has grown significantly, as sea ice has been reduced and maritime routes became accessible, enabling easier approach to natural resources. Since around 2007, the Putin regime has been pursuing an aggressive foreign policy against the Western world and NATO.

The new climate in the region brought expanded military and economic activity by both Arctic and non-Arctic nations, mainly China and Russia. In recent years Russia significantly increased is military infrastructure in the Arctic, by reopening, reinforcing and modernizing some bases along the northern coastline, while increasing air and naval patrols. Meanwhile, China that stated that it is a "near Arctic state", has also increased its scientific, commercial, and logistical operations in the area.

After Finland and Sweden joined NATO, seven of the eight Arctic countries became members of the alliance. This has given NATO a stronger and more direct role in Arctic security. Because of this, NATO has launched Arctic Sentry as part of its wider efforts to strengthen shared defense and deterrence in Northern Europe.

== Objectives ==
NATO Arctic Sentry's designated mission is to increase NATO’s presence in the region, by enhancing intelligence, surveillance, and reconnaissance activities. The aim is to strengthen NATO’s offensive and defensive capabilities while improving coordination between the allied forces, operating in Arctic and sub-Arctic conditions. The mission also supports and connects existing national and multinational exercises in the region while helping to protect critical infrastructure and important sea routes. Arctic Sentry operates across several areas, including air, sea, land, cyber, and space.

One focus is the GIUK gap between Greenland, Iceland, and the United Kingdom as a route from the Arctic Ocean to the North Atlantic, which is also used by submarines of the Russian Navy.

== Activities ==
NATO Arctic Sentry will coordinate and support a range of activities of NATO and allied countries. This will include maritime patrols and naval deployments, air policing and long range reconnaissance missions, and military exercises focused on Arctic conditions. The mission will also be based on shared intelligence. joint operational planning, and the development of logistical and cold-weather capabilities. This will be achieved under an allied framework with aligned contribution by all participants, improve overall operational readiness in the region. On 12 February 2026 it was reported that Sweden will send Gripen fighter jets to patrol Greenland, as part of the Arctic Sentry activities.

The German Minister of Defence Pistorius (Merz cabinet) has announced that Germany will send four Eurofighter Typhoon.

== Participating countries ==
NATO Arctic Sentry, is a mission involving multiple countries, mainly those with Arctic or northern territories. The countries that will take part in the mission are:

- Canada
- Denmark (including Greenland)
- Finland
- Iceland
- Norway
- Sweden
- United Kingdom
- United States

Other NATO members may contribute assets, personnel, or support functions.

== Strategic significance ==
NATO Arctic Sentry represents the alliance's strategic goals and collective defense, in response to the Russian and Chinese activities and the Russian invasion to the Ukraine. At the same time it is regarded as part of NATO’s adaptation to emerging security challenges linked to climate change, infrastructure vulnerability, and great-power competition.

== See also ==
- Arctic Council
- Arctic policy of NATO
- Icelandic Air Policing
- NATO strategy in the Arctic
- Operation Arctic Endurance
- Second presidency of Donald Trump#Greenland
