= NATO Tiger Association =

Informal association of NATO air forces

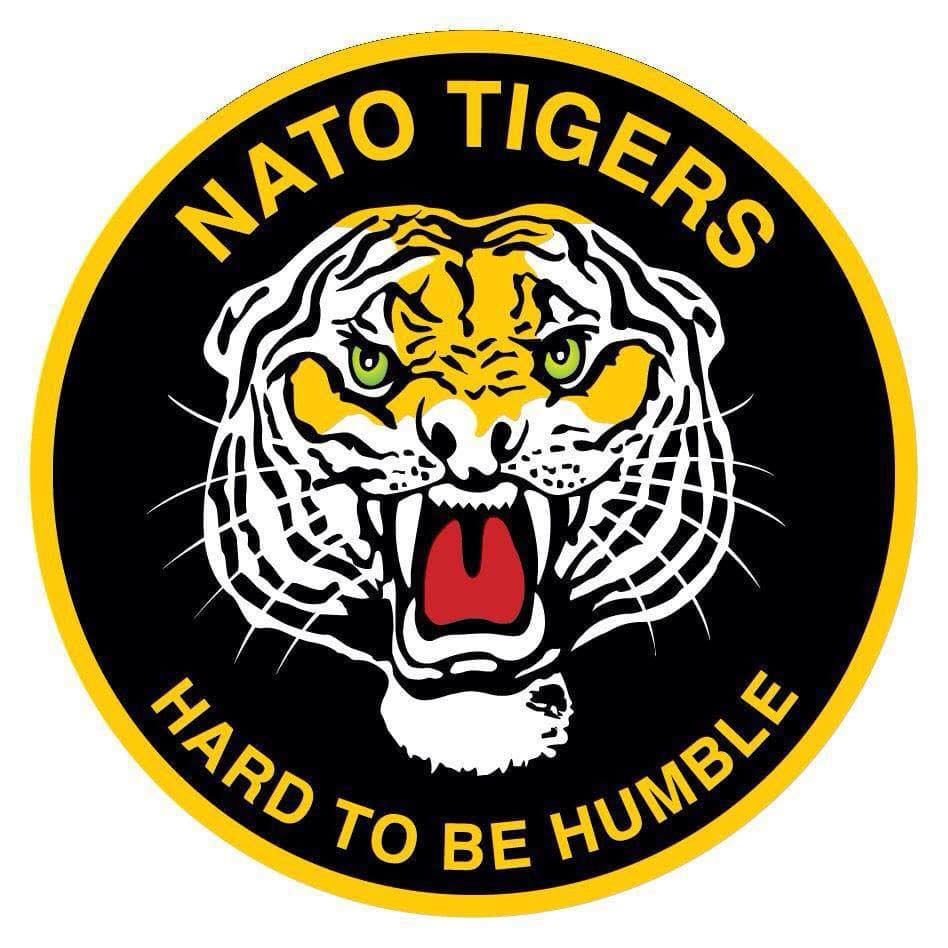
NATO Tiger Association logo

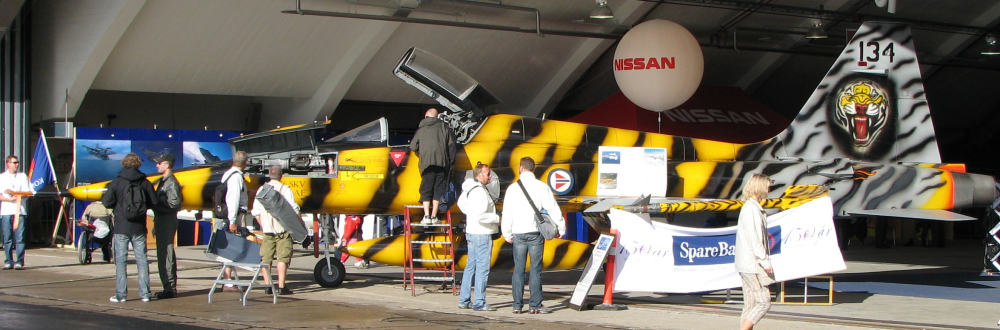
A Northrop F-5 Freedom Fighter of 336 squadron, Royal Norwegian Air Force during a 'Tiger Meet' in 2007. Tiger Meet aircraft are often painted in 'Tiger stripes'

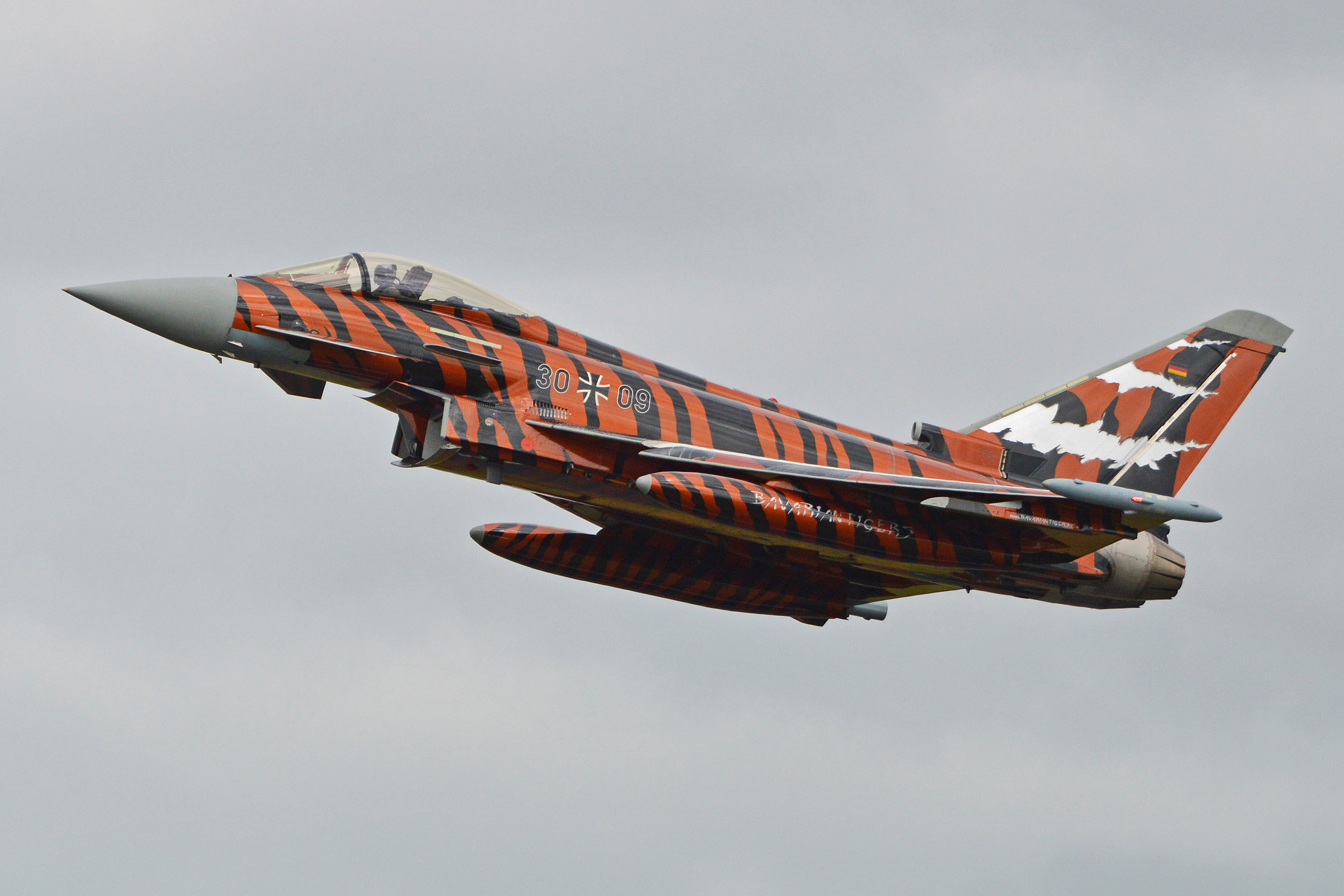
A German Eurofighter Typhoon of Taktisches Luftwaffengeschwader 74 at the 'Tiger Meet' in 2014

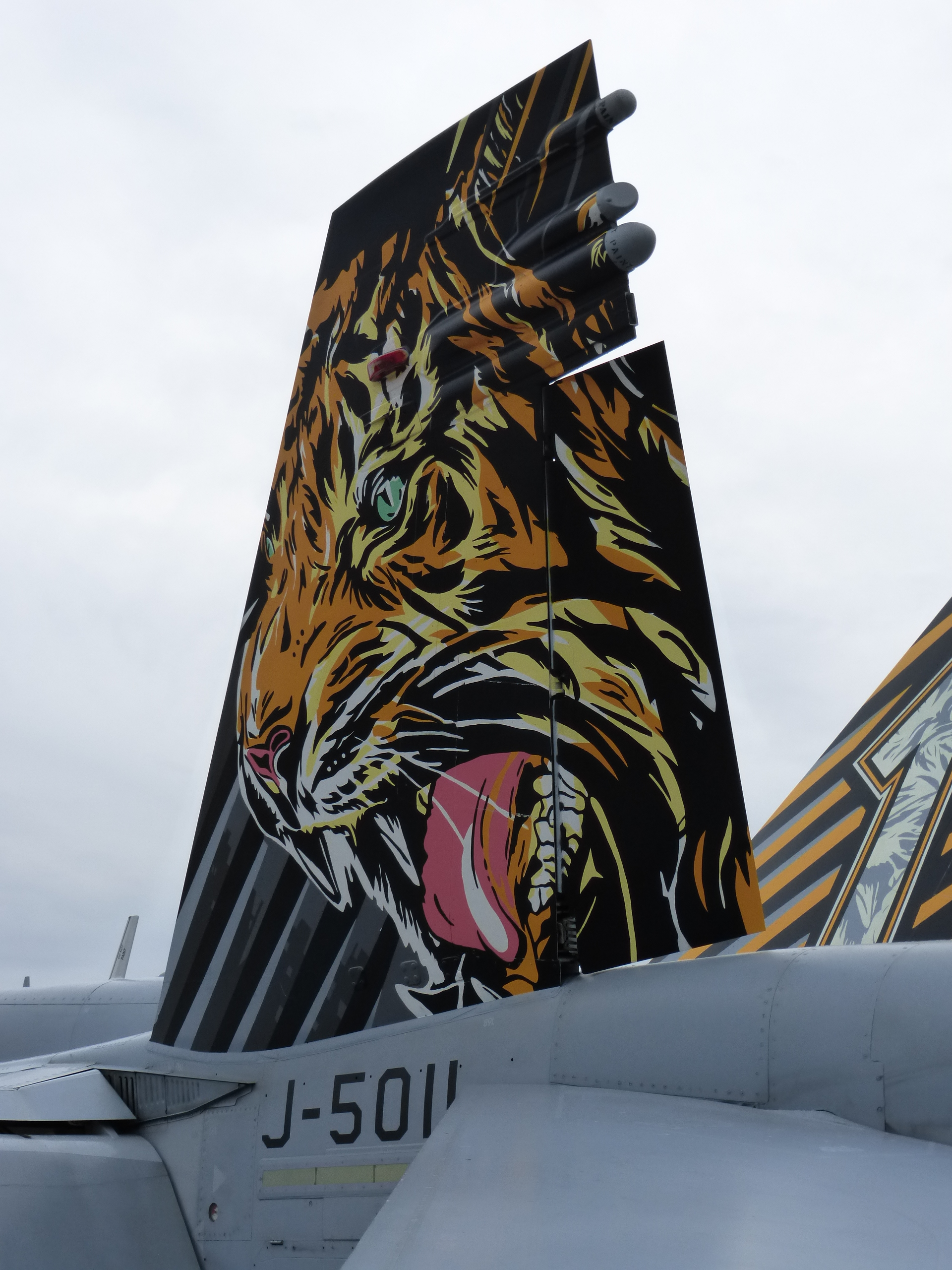
Tail fin of a Swiss Air Force Fliegerstaffel 11 F/A-18C Hornet

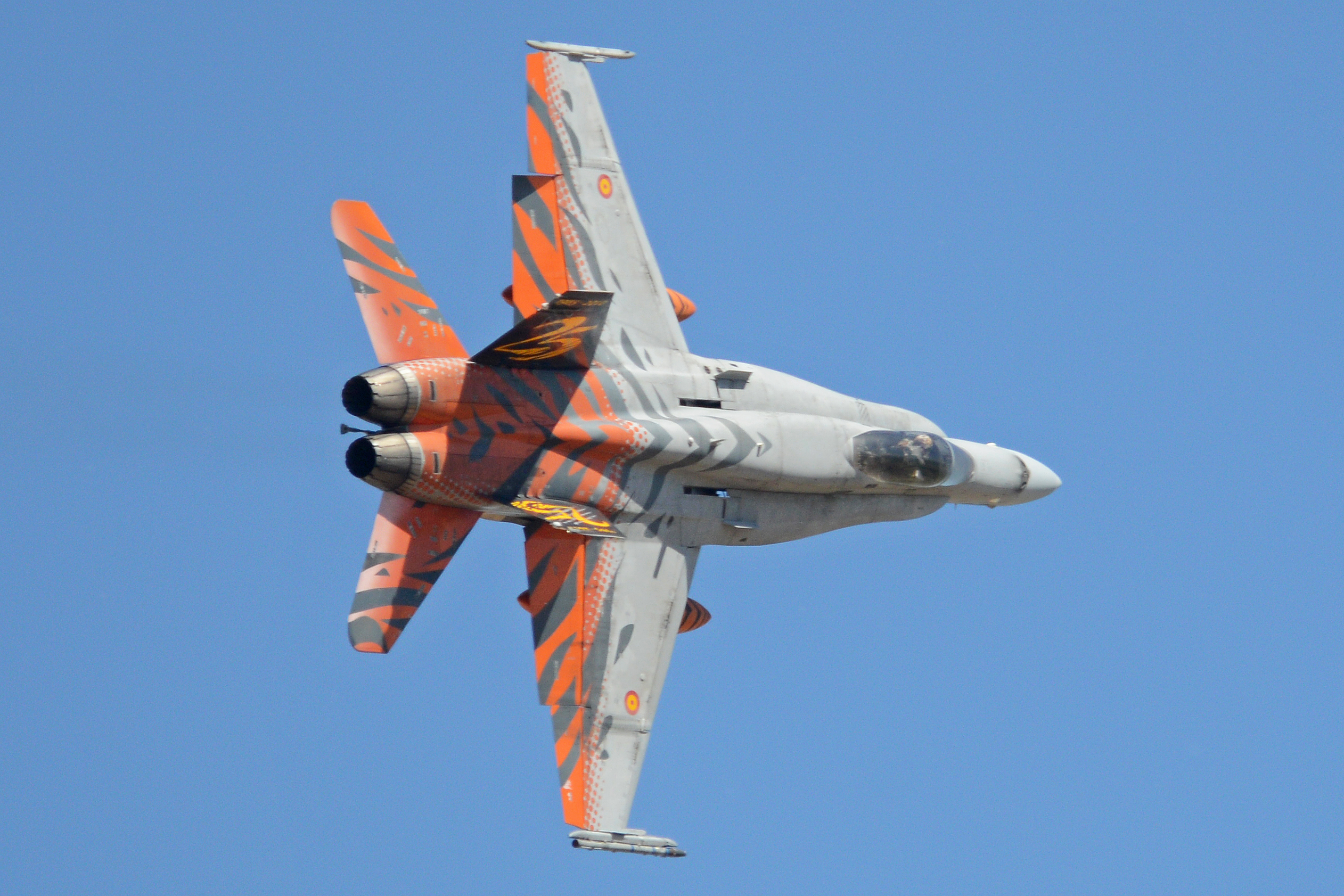
Spanish EF-18AM Hornet at Tiger Meet at Zaragoza Air Base, 2016

The NATO Tiger Association or the Association of Tiger Squadrons was established in 1961. Promoted by French Defence minister Pierre Messmer, its role is to promote solidarity between NATO air forces. However, it is not part of the formal NATO structure.

The 79th Tactical Fighter Squadron (TFS) of the United States Air Forces in Europe took the initiative and on 19 July 1961, they invited No. 74 Squadron RAF and EC (Fighter Squadron) 1/12 Cambresis of the French Armée de l'air to RAF Woodbridge in England. France was then a full military member of NATO.

Capitain Michael Dugan of the 79th Tactical Fighter Squadron (TFS) searched for another squadrons in all European NATO air forces. He managed to find 5 new squadrons, the second meeting in 1962 with 8 squadrons participating.

As of May 2025, the squadrons included in the Association are 24 full members, 9 honorary members, 1 probationary member, 8 disbanded members and 4 former members. All members of the Association of Tiger Squadrons have a tiger as part of their squadron crests.

As well as being opportunities for NATO air forces to share ideas and experiences, the 'Tiger Meets' are also public relations exercises for NATO. NATO aircraft are often brightly painted with tiger stripes.

== Members ==
The following 24 squadrons are full members of the association.

- (Austria) Austrian Air Force
  - 2.Staffel / Überwachungsgeschwader
- (Belgium) Belgian Air Force
  - 31 Smaldeel
- (Czech Republic) Czech Air Force
  - 211. taktická letka (211th Tactical Squadron)
  - 221. vrtulníková letka (221st Helicopter Squadron)
- (France) French Air Force
  - Escadron de Chasse et d'Expérimentation 1/30 'Cote d'Argent'
  - Escadron de Chasse 3/30 Lorraine
- (France) French Army
  - EHRA 3
- (France) French Navy
  - Flottille 11F
- (Germany) German Air Force
  - Taktisches Luftwaffengeschwader 51 "Immelmann" (Tactical Air Force Wing 51)
  - Taktisches Luftwaffengeschwader 74 "Bavarian Tigers" (Tactical Air Force Wing 74)
- (Greece) Hellenic Air Force
  - 335 Squadron "Tigers"
- (Hungary) Hungarian Air Force
  - 101/1. Harcászati Repülő Század
- (Italy) Italian Air Force
  - 12° Gruppo
  - 21° Gruppo (387th and 388th Flights)
- NATO (NATO Airborne Early Warning Force)
  - Squadron 1
- Royal Netherlands Air Force
  - 313 Squadron
- (Poland) Polish Air Force
  - 6 Squadron
- (Portugal) Portuguese Air Force
  - Esquadra 301 "Jaguares"
- (Switzerland) Swiss Air Force
  - Fliegerstaffel 11
- (Spain) Spanish Air Force
  - 142 Escuadrón
  - Ala 15
- (Turkey) Turkish Air Force
  - 192'nci Kaplan Filo
- (United Kingdom) Royal Air Force
  - 230 Squadron
- (United Kingdom) Royal Navy
  - 814 Naval Air Squadron

=== Honorary members ===
- (Canada) Royal Canadian Air Force
  - 439 CSS
- (India) Indian Air Force
  - 1 Squadron
- (Slovakia) Slovak Air Force
  - 1 Lt (Bojová letka)
- United States Air Force
  - 37th Bomb Squadron
  - 79th Fighter Squadron
  - 120th Fighter Squadron
  - 391st Fighter Squadron
  - 393rd Bomb Squadron
- United States Air National Guard
  - 141st Air Refueling Squadron
- United States Navy
  - VP-8

=== Probationary members ===
- (Germany) Marineflieger
  - 3. Bordhubschrauberstaffel / MFG 5
- (Slovakia) Slovak Air Force
  - 1. Bojová letka

=== Former members ===
- Escadron de Chasse 1/7 "Provence" (French Air Force)
- 53rd Fighter Squadron, USAF
- 494th Fighter Squadron, USAF
- 155° Gruppo, ItAF

=== Disbanded Members ===
Members of the NATO Tiger Association until their disbanding by their respective organization.

- 336 Squadron, Royal Norwegian Air Force (disbanded 1999)
- 338 Squadron, Royal Norwegian Air Force (disbanded 2018)
- Aufklärungsgeschwader 52 (German Air Force)
- Jagdbombergeschwader 32 (disbanded March 2013)
- Jagdbomberstaffel 431 (German Air Force)
- Escadron de Chasse 1/12 (French Air Force)
- 336 Squadron, Royal Norwegian Air Force
- 74 (F) Squadron, RAF (disbanded 2000)

== Tiger Meets ==
The most publicly visible aspect of the NATO Tiger Association are the annual Tiger Meets, during which member squadrons gather for exercises, conferences, and public relations.

Event	Dates	Location	Host	Silver Tiger	Units	Ref
1961	19–20 July	(United Kingdom) RAF Woodbridge	(United States) 79 TFS		3	
1962	22–25 August	(United Kingdom) RAF Woodbridge	(United States) 79 TFS		8	]
1963	27–30 August	(Belgium) Kleine Brogel	(Belgium) 31 Smaldeel		8	
1964	9–15 June	(France) Cambrai	(France) EC 1/12		8	
1965	14–18 August	(Germany) Bitburg	(United States) 53 TFS		8	
1966	5–9 July	(United Kingdom) RAF Leuchars	(United Kingdom) 74 (F) Sqn		8	
1967	29 May – 2 June	(Germany) Leck Air Base	(Germany) AG 52		7	
1968	16–20 August	(Germany) CAFB Lahr	(Canada) 439 TFS		8	
1969	4–8 July	(United Kingdom) RAF Woodbridge	(United States) 79 TFS		8	
1970	6–11 June	(Belgium) Kleine Brogel	(Belgium) 31 Smaldeel		8	
1971	14–21 June	(United Kingdom) RAF Upper Heyford	(Germany) Jagdbomberstaffel 431		9	
1972	12–19 June	(France) Cambrai	(France) EC 1/12		9	
1973	16–22 June	(Italy) Cameri	(Italy) 21 Gruppo		10	
1974	25 June – 1 July	(Germany) Bitburg	(United States) 53 TFS		9	
1975	3–9 August	(Germany) Leck	(Germany) AG 52		9	
1976	31 May – 4 June	(Germany) Baden-Soellingen	(Canada) 439 TFS		9	
1977	22–28 June	(United Kingdom) RAF Greenham Common	(United States) 79 TFS	(Canada) 439 TFS	11	
1978	19–26 June	(Belgium) Kleine Brogel	(Belgium) 31 Smaldeel	(Belgium) 31 Smaldeel	13	
1979	18–25 June	(France) BA Cambrai	(France) EC 1/12	(Canada) 439 TFS	13	
1980	9–16 June	(Italy) Cameri	(Italy) 21 Gruppo	(Portugal) Esq 301	14	
1981	12–15 June	(Germany) Bitburg	(United States) 53 TFS	(Canada) 439 TFS	8	
1982	26–30 August	(Germany) Gütersloh	(United Kingdom) 230 Sqn	(Switzerland) Fliegerstaffel 11	12	
1983	10–16 June	(Germany) Baden-Soellingen	(Canada) 439 TFS	(Germany) JaboSt 431	12	
1984	13–20 August	(Germany) Leck	(Germany) AG 52	(Belgium) 31 Smaldeel	13	
1985	1–8 July	(Belgium) Kleine Brogel	(Belgium) 31 Smaldeel	(Portugal) Esq 301	13	
1986	8–16 June	(France) Cambrai	(France) EC 1/12	(United States) 53 TFS	18	
1987	23–30 June	(Portugal) Montijo	(Portugal) Esq 301	(Germany) Jagdbomberstaffel 431	18	
1988	5–12 July	(Italy) Cameri	(Italy) 21 Gruppo	(United Kingdom) 74 (F) Sqn	14	
1990	12–17 August	(United Kingdom) RAF Upper Heyford	(United States) 79 TFS	(United States) 79 TFS	13	
1991	17–21 July	(United Kingdom) RAF Fairford	RIAT	(United States) 53 TFS	16	
1992	14–22 May	(Spain) Albacete	(Spain) 142 Esc	(France) EC 1/12	15	
1993	8–13 August	(Belgium) Kleine Brogel	(Belgium) 31 Smaldeel	(United States) 79 TFS	10	
1994	3–10 May	(France) Cambrai	(France) EC 1/12	(Belgium) 31 Smaldeel	19	
1996	21–29 May	(Portugal) Beja	(Portugal) Esq 301	(Belgium) 31 Smaldeel	15	
1997	16–21 July	(United Kingdom) RAF Fairford	RIAT	(Belgium) 31 Smaldeel	24	
1998	15–26 June	(Germany) Lechfeld	(Germany) JaboSt 321	(Italy) 21 Gruppo	18	
2001	18–24 June	(Belgium) Kleine Brogel	(Belgium) 31 Smaldeel	(France) EC 1/12	18	
2002	28 June – 9 July	(Portugal) Beja	(Portugal) Esq 301	(Czech Republic) 221 LtBVr	19	
2003	2–8 June	(France) Cambrai	(France) EC 1/12	(Belgium) 31 Smaldeel	13	
2004	30 August – 6 September	(Germany) Schleswig-Jagel	(Germany) TLG 51	(Germany) JaboSt 321	14	
2005	2–9 May	(Turkey) Balikesir	(Turkey) 192 Filo	(United Kingdom) 230 Sqn	11	
2006	25 September – 2 October	(Spain) Albacete	(Spain) 142 Esc	(France) EC 1/12	13	
2007	23 September – 1 October	(Norway) Ørland	(Norway) 338 Skv	(Belgium) 31 Smaldeel	18	
2008	22 – 29 June	(France) Landivisiau	(France) Flottille 11F	(Switzerland) Fliegerstaffel 11	19	
2009	14–25 September	(Belgium) Kleine Brogel	(Belgium) 31 Smaldeel	(France) EC 1/12	18	
2010	4–15 October	(Netherlands) Volkel	(Netherlands) 313 Sqn.	(Czech Republic) 211th Sqn	18	
2011	9–20 May	(France) Cambrai	(France) EC 1/12	(Portugal) Esq 301	19	
2012	29 May – 8 June	(Norway) Ørland	(Norway) 338 Skv	(Belgium) 31 Smaldeel	17	
2013	17–28 June	(Norway) Ørland	(Norway) 338 Skv	(Germany) TLG 51	19	
2014	16–27 June	(Germany) Schleswig-Jagel	(Germany) TLG 51	(Switzerland) Fliegerstaffel 11	16	
2015	4–16 May	(Turkey) Konya	(Turkey) 192 Filo	(Italy) 21 Gruppo	13	
2016	16–27 May	(Spain) Zaragoza	(Spain) Ala 15	(Belgium) 31 Smaldeel	22	
2017	5–16 June	(France) Landivisiau	(France) Flottille 11F	(Belgium) 31 Smaldeel	20	
2018	14–25 May	(Poland) Poznań	(Poland) 6 ELT	(Netherlands) 313 Sqn.	22	
2019	13–24 May	(France) Mont-de-Marsan	(France) EC 3/30	(Portugal) Esq 301	18	
2021	2–14 May	(Portugal) Beja	(Portugal) Esq 301	(Italy) 12° Gruppo	8	
"XT-Roar-dinary Tiger Event" 2021	7–14 September	(Belgium) Kleine Brogel	(Belgium) 31 Smaldeel	Event cancelled due to Covid-19		
2022	9–20 May	(Greece) Araxos	(Greece) 335 Mira	(France) EC 3/30	10	
2023	2–13 October	(Italy) Gioia Del Colle	(Italy) 12° Gruppo	(Germany) TaktLwG 74	18	
2024	3-13 June	(Germany) Schleswig-Jagel	(Germany) TLG 51	(Poland) 6 ELT	14	
2025	21 September - 6 October	(Portugal) Beja	(Portugal) Esq 301	(Switzerland) Fliegerstaffel 11	16	
2026	4-15 May	(Greece) Araxos	(Greece) 335 Mira	(Italy) 12° Gruppo	10	

== Bibliography ==
- Heuvel, Coen van den & Tuyn, Jac van. Tiger Meet, the 25th Anniversary 'NATO' Tiger Meet, Osprey, 1986, 978-0-8504-5703-2.
