= 31st Squadron (Belgium) =

31st 'Tiger' Squadron
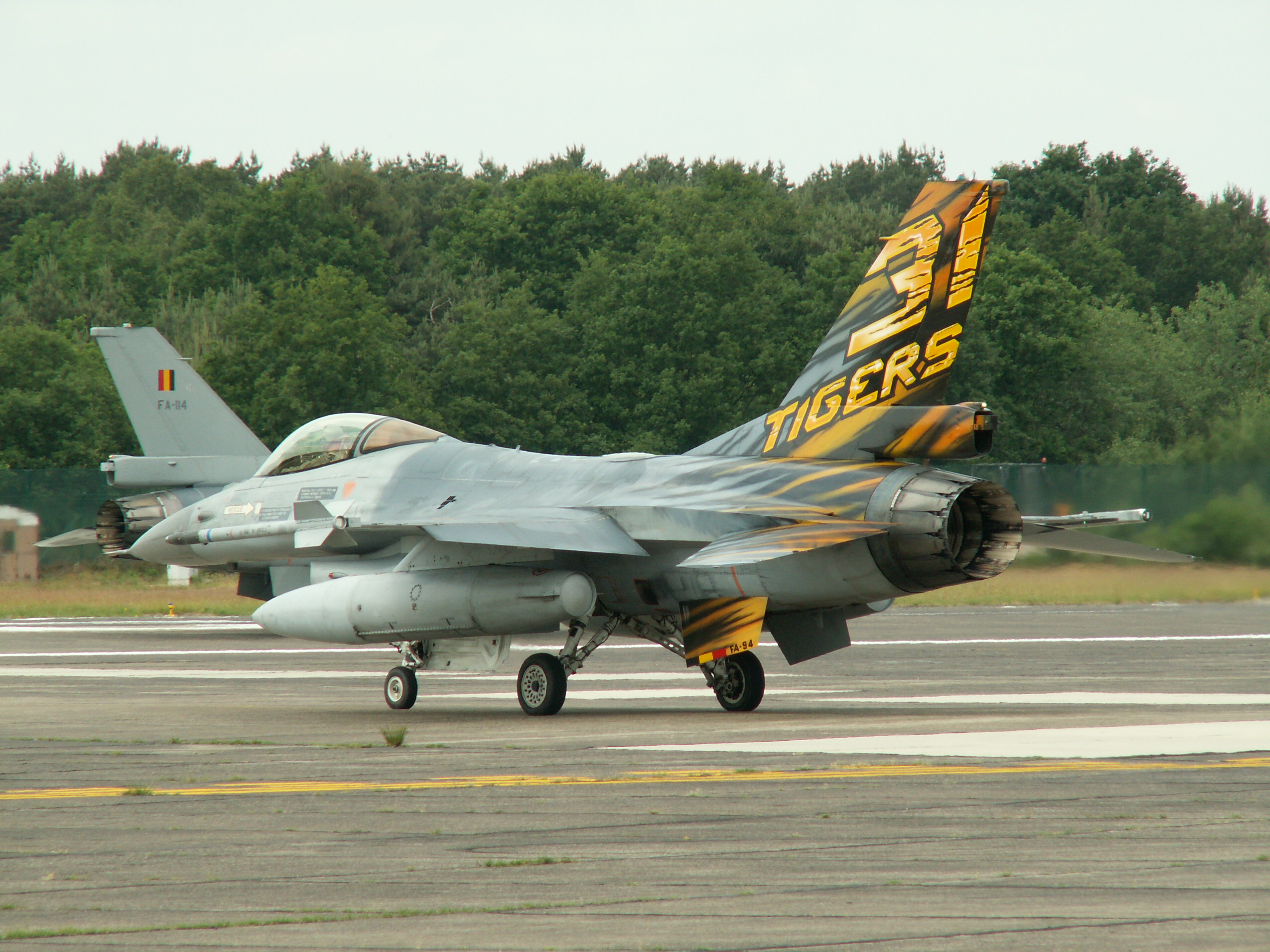
- F-16 of 31st Squadron, 2005
- Active: 1 October 1951 – present
- Country: Belgium
- Branch: Belgian Air Force
- Role: (Close air support and nuclear strike),
- Size: Squadron
- Part of: 10th Tactical Wing
- Motto: In sanguine vinum

Aircraft flown
- Fighter: F-16 Fighting Falcon

The 31st 'Tiger' Squadron is a strike-fighter squadron in the Belgian Air Force of the Belgian Armed Forces. It is part of the 10th Tactical Wing and operates F-16 Fighting Falcons. They use a tiger as their squadron emblem.

== History ==
The 31st Tiger Squadron starts with its history on 1 October 1951, when it was founded as a part of the exhibition together with the 23rd and 27th squadron during the 10th Tactical Wing at Beauvechain Air Base. After that, the team of the 10th Tactical Wing transferred their airbase at Chièvres. There, a first flight was executed for the 31st Tiger Squadron and was registered as the legendary World War II Spitfire MK XIV on 4 January 1952.

The squadron became a member of the NATO Tiger Association and attended the 2nd Tiger Meet in 1962. They then hosted the following year's event at their home airbase of Kleine Brogel Air Base in 1963. They remain one of the association's longest-standing members.

In June 2005, during the operation "Eastern Eagle" with the collaboration of Kabul International Airport, the 31st Tiger Squadron with four F-16s flew numerous mission over Afghanistan with the support of ISAF troops.
