= 480th Fighter Squadron =

480th Fighter Squadron

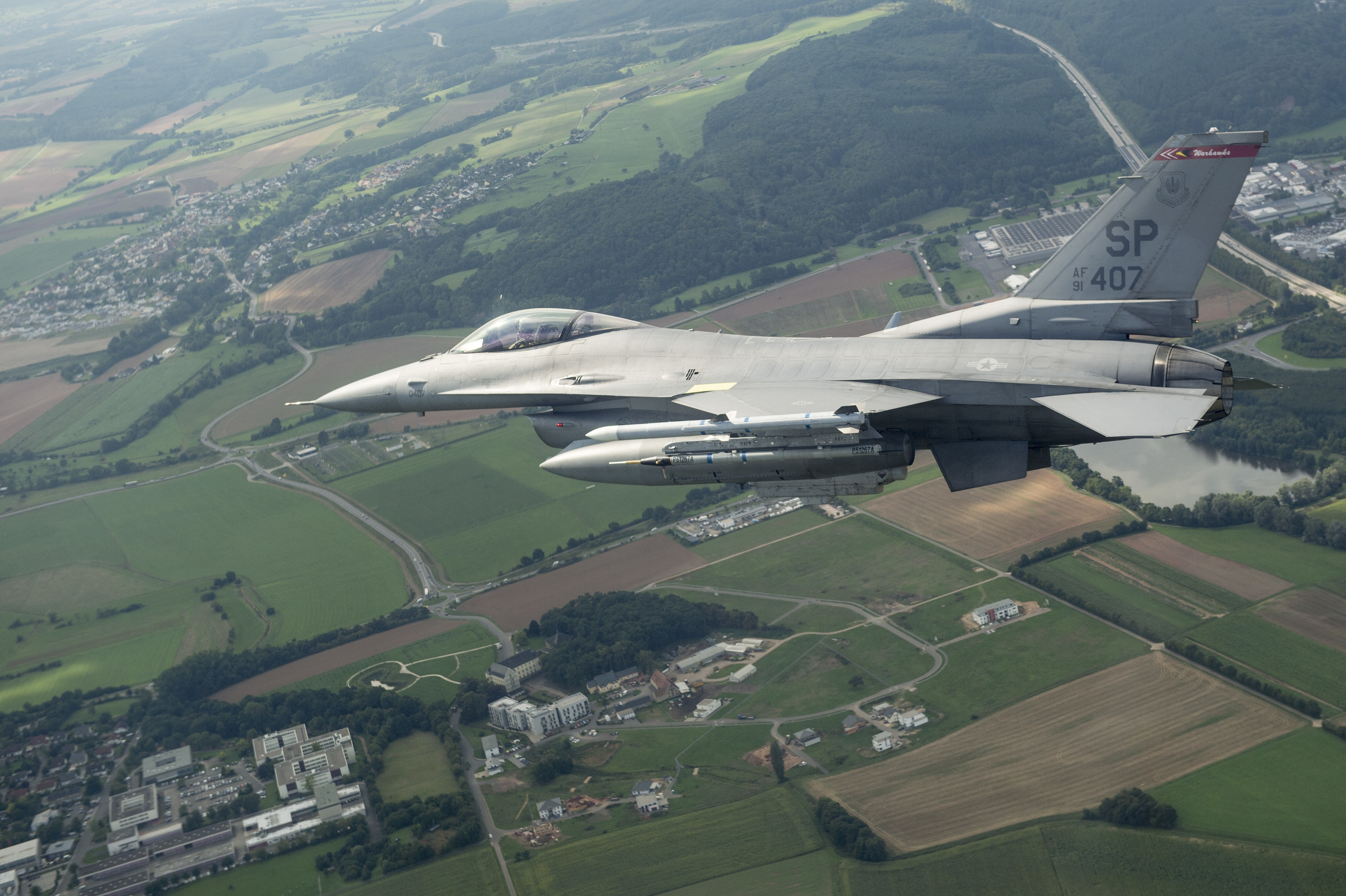
- Squadron F-16 Fighting Falcon over Germany, 2015
- Active: 1942–1944; 1951–1956; 1957–1959; 1962–1971; 1976–1994; 2010–present
- Country: United States
- Branch: United States Air Force
- Role: Fighter, Wild Weasel
- Part of: United States Air Forces in Europe – Air Forces Africa
- Garrison/HQ: Spangdahlem Air Base, Germany
- Nickname: Warhawks
- Mottos: First In, Last Out; Escadrille to Warhawks; We Deliver (1951–1956)
- Equipment: General Dynamics F-16CJ Fighting Falcon
- Engagements: European theater of Operations; Cuban Missile Crisis; Vietnam War; Gulf War; Operation Odyssey Dawn; Operation New Dawn; Operation Enduring Freedom; Operation Inherent Resolve
- Decorations: Presidential Unit Citation; Air Force Outstanding Unit Award with Combat "V" Device; Air Force Outstanding Unit Award; Republic of Vietnam Gallantry Cross with Palm

Insignia
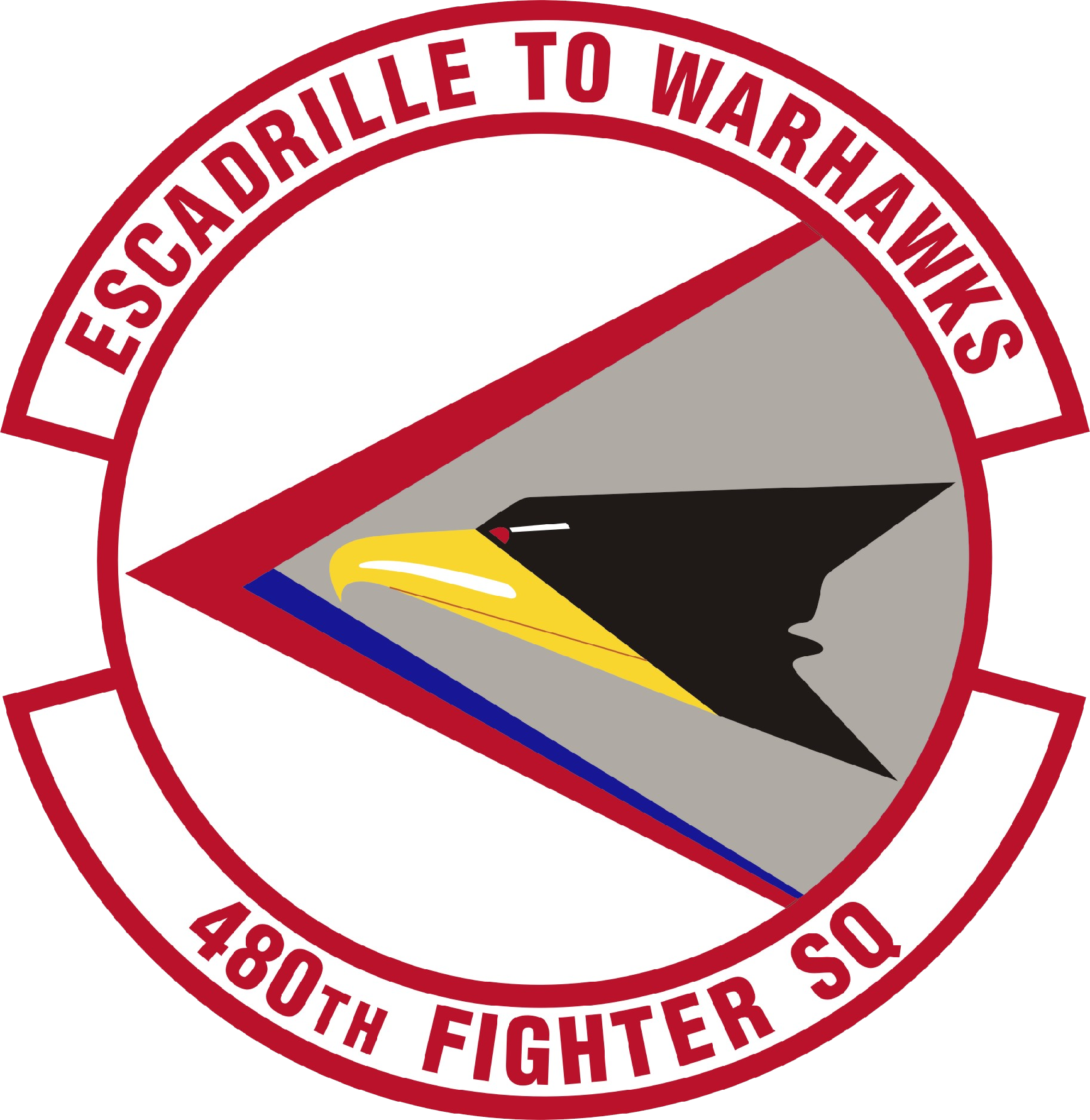
- 480th Fighter Sq emblem (Note: Modified 20 August 2010.)

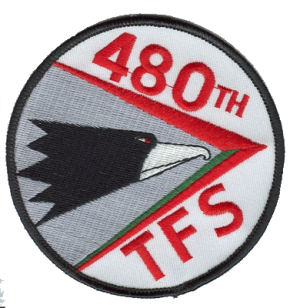
- Patch with 480th Tactical Fighter Squadron emblem (Note: Approved c. March 1959.)

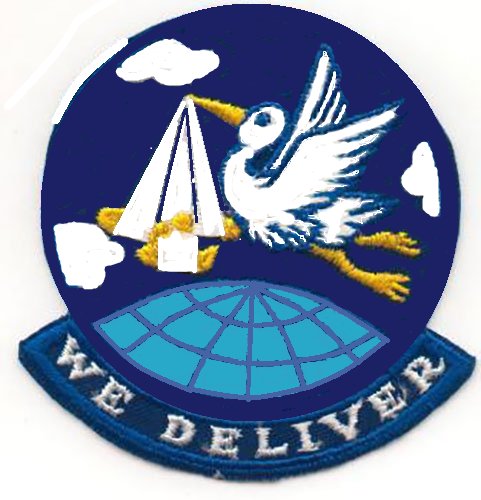
- 580th Air Resupply Squadron emblem
- Tail codes: CA-CZ (Dec 1965-Apr 1969) (Note: Individual aircraft had different letters following "C" for the squadron); HK (Apr 1969 – Nov 1971); SP (Nov 1976 – Apr 1994; Aug 2010 – present)

The 480th Fighter Squadron, nicknamed the "Warhawks", is an active United States Air Force unit operating the General Dynamics F-16CJ Fighting Falcon. The 480th, assigned to the 52nd Fighter Wing at Spangdahlem Air Base, Germany is the only United States Air Forces in Europe – Air Forces Africa flying unit performing the Suppression of Enemy Air Defenses mission.

The first predecessor of the squadron, the 480th Bombardment Squadron, served as a Replacement Training Unit from 1942 until it was disbanded in May 1944 in a general reorganization of Army Air Forces training and support units in the United States. It was consolidated with the 480th Tactical Fighter Squadron in 1985.

The squadron's second predecessor was organized in 1951 as the 580th Aerial Resupply Squadron. It engaged in special operations in Europe and the Middle East from 1952 until 1956. It was redesignated the 480th Air Resupply Squadron in 1985 before being consolidated with the 480th Tactical Fighter Squadron.

The 480th Fighter-Bomber Squadron was activated in September 1957 as the fourth squadron of the 366th Fighter-Bomber Wing. Redesignated 480th Tactical Fighter Squadron in 1958, it was inactivated the following year along with the 366th Wing for budgetary reasons. It was activated again in 1962 in France to replace Air National Guard units that had been mobilized for the Berlin Crisis of 1961. The following year, as the Air Force withdrew its fighter units from France, the squadron moved to Holloman Air Force Base, New Mexico, where it transitioned to the McDonnell F-4 Phantom II. It deployed to Viet Nam in 1965 and flew combat missions until inactivating in 1971 with the withdrawal of United States forces from Viet Nam.

== Mission ==
The primary mission of the squadron's F-16CJs is suppression of enemy air defenses, called SEAD.

== History ==
=== World War II ===
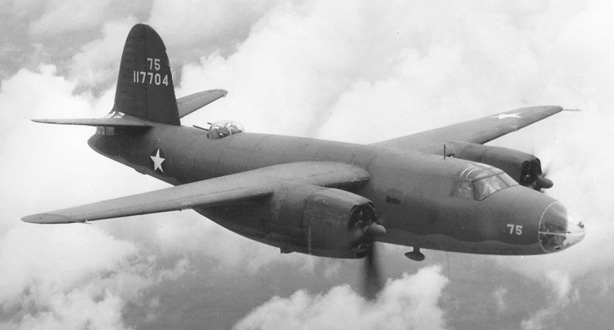
B-26 Marauder as flown by the squadron

The squadron's first predecessor was activated in July 1942 at MacDill Field, Florida as one of the four original squadrons of the 336th Bombardment Group. It served as a Replacement Training Unit for Martin B-26 Marauder medium bombers. The squadron was stationed at several bases in Florida before settling at Lake Charles Army Air Field in November 1943.

However, the Army Air Forces (AAF) found that standard military units, whose manning was based on relatively inflexible tables of organization were not well adapted to the training mission, particularly to the replacement training mission. Accordingly, in the spring of 1944, the 336th Group, its components and supporting units at Lake Charles, were disbanded on 1 May and replaced by the 332nd AAF Base Unit (Replacement Training Unit, Medium, Bombardment). The squadron was replaced by Section T of the new base unit. Just before disbanding, the 336th Group began to receive Douglas A-26 Invaders to replace its Marauders

=== Special operations ===
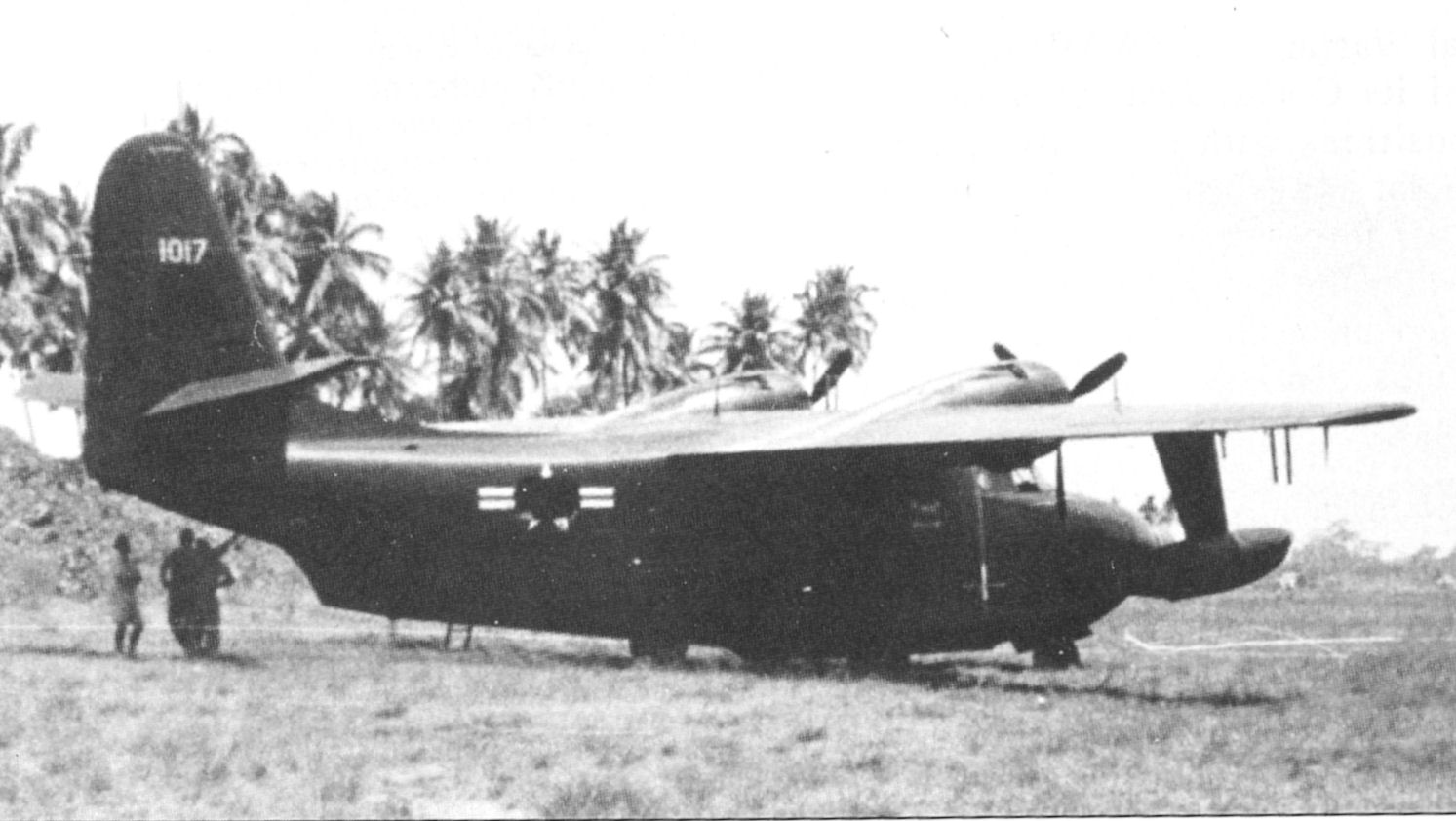
SA-16 Albatross of an air resupply squadron

The second predecessor of the squadron was activated at Mountain Home Air Force Base, Idaho on 16 April 1951 as the 580th Aerial Resupply Squadron and assigned to the 580th Air Resupply and Communications Group. A few months later, the "Aerial" in its name was replaced by "Air." The squadron was equipped with a mix of twelve Boeing B-29 Superfortress, four Fairchild C-119 Flying Boxcar, and four Grumman SA-16 Albatross aircraft. The squadron's B-29s were modified by removing all defensive armament, with a parachutist's exit replacing the belly turret. Resupply bundles were mounted on racks in the bomb bay. The squadron's mission included infiltration, resupply, and exfiltration of guerillas behind enemy lines and the aerial delivery of psychological warfare materials. It trained to provide evacuation and supply support to personnel in enemy-occupied territory.

During the summer of 1951, a squadron B-29 participated in a test of the Personnel Pickup Ground Station, to see if the system could be used to extract personnel. In addition to a larger opening at the former belly turret location, the plane had an elongated tailhook near its tail. Although the tests proved the system was feasible, safety considerations with such a large aircraft flying so close to the ground resulted in the program being dropped.

In September 1952, the squadron moved to Wheelus Field, Libya, with the aircrews ferrying their planes, while the ground echelon proceeded by ship. There, it trained for aerial delivery of equipment and supplies and for evacuation of friendly forces. Squadron SA-16s flew missions into the Balkans behind the Iron Curtain and into the southern Soviet Union. In March 1956, a squadron SA-16 operating out of Teheran, Iran successfully completed a night exfiltraion mission in the Caspian Sea, delivering its passengers to a ship in the Mediterranean Sea.

The squadron was inactivated in October 1956 as the Air Force gave budget priority to building up strategic forces. In July 1985, the squadron was redesignated the 480th Air Resupply Squadron while remaining in inactive status. That September, it was consolidated with the active 480th Tactical Fighter Squadron.

=== Activation as a fighter squadron ===
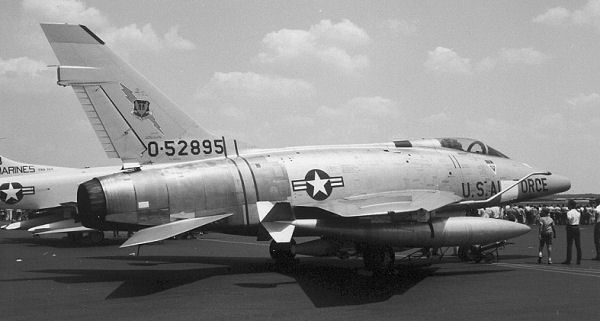
F-100 Super Sabre at England AFB

The 480th Fighter-Bomber Squadron was activated on 25 September 1957 at Alexandria Air Force Base, Louisiana, as part of the 366th Fighter-Bomber Wing. During this time it was the wing's first squadron to transition to the North American F-100D and F-100F Super Sabre, although it also continued to fly Republic F-84F Thunderstreaks. On 1 July 1958, the unit was redesignated the 480th Tactical Fighter Squadron. On 1 April 1959, it was inactivated along with the remainder of the 366th Wing as Tactical Air Command reduced its fighter units due to budget limitations.

=== Thunderstreak operations in France and New Mexico ===
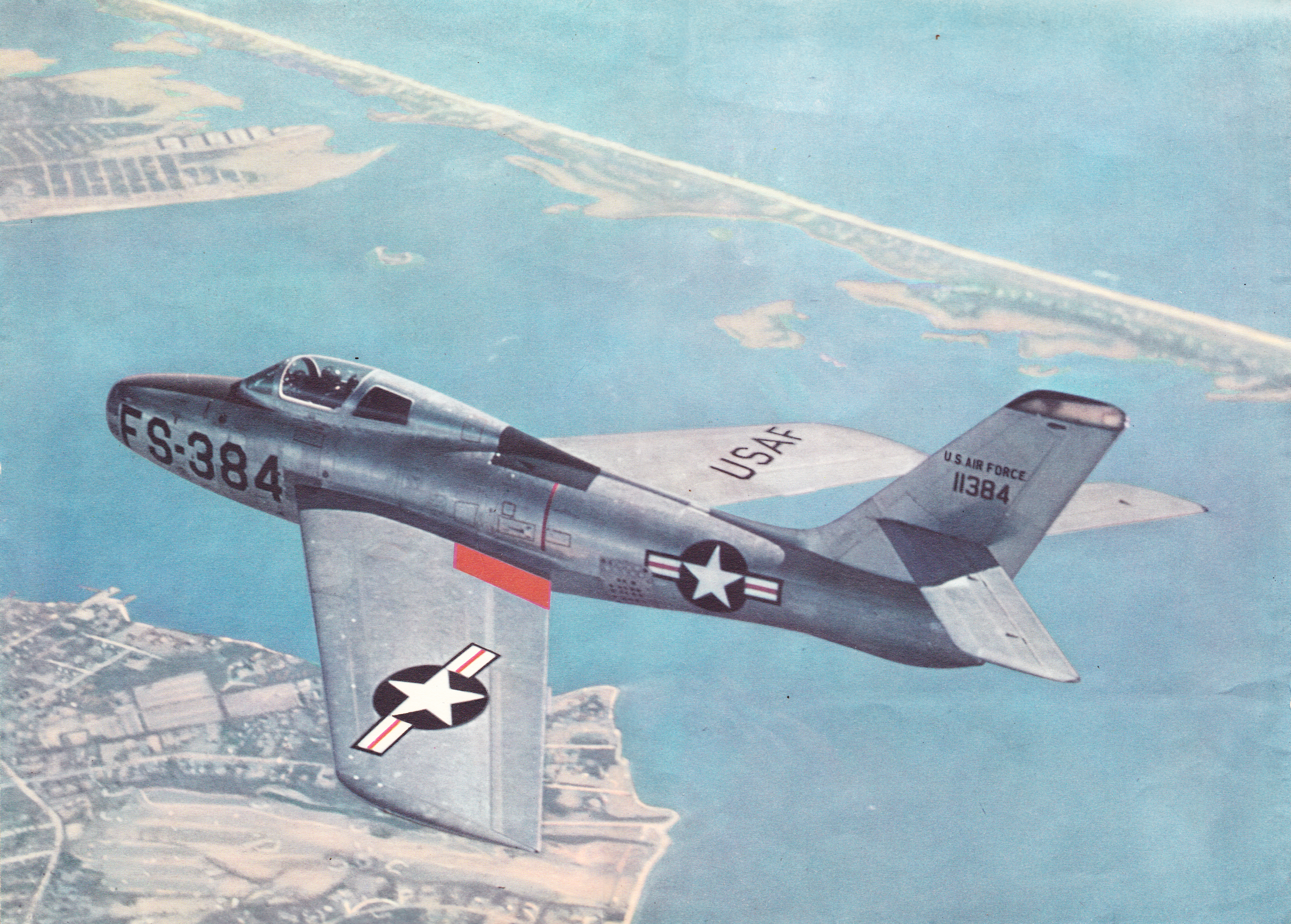
F-84F Thunderstreak as flown by the 480th

In response to the Berlin Crisis of 1961, the Air Force had mobilized the 108th Tactical Fighter Wing. While the wing remained in the United states, elements deployed to Chaumont Air Base, where United States Air Forces in Europe organized the 7108th Tactical Fighter Wing as their headquarters. On 8 May 1962, the National Guard units returned to the United States, while their F-84Fs were transferred to the 366th Tactical Fighter Wing, which replaced the 7108th. The 480th was reactivated along with the 366th Wing. The squadron was intended to replace National Guard units at Phalsbourg Air Base, but the runway at Phalsbourg was under construction, so the squadron initially located with wing headquarters at Chaumont, moving to Phalsbourg in December. Starting in September the squadron sent F-84s to Wheelus Air Base for bombing and gunnery training.

In addition to its primary, mission of providing air support for Seventh Army, the squadron kept four F-84s on 24 hour alert status for air defense of France and West Germany. During the Cuban Missile Crisis in the fall of 1962 the squadron maintained all its planes on alert and pilots training at Wheelus and their planes were recalled. After two weeks, the squadron resumed its normal posture. On 15 June 1963, the squadron ended all alert and operational commitments and began preparing their Thunderstreaks for ferrying to Holloman Air Force Base, New Mexico. The official move to Holloman was on 12 July.

The squadron initially flew F-84s at Holloman, flying in various military exercises, tests and demonstration. Starting in December 1963, its pilots began transition training on the McDonnell F-4C Phantom II, although it would be February 1965 before the squadron began to receive its own Phantoms.

=== Vietnam War ===
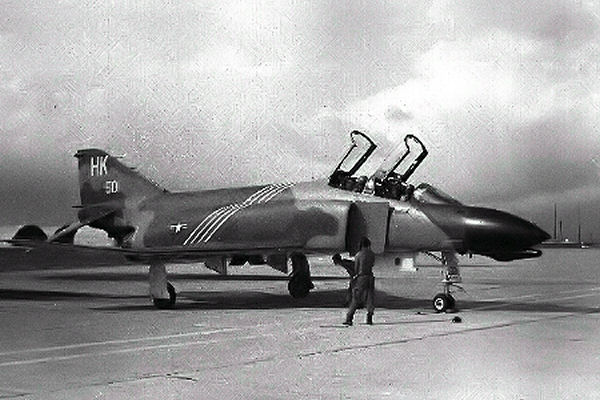
A squadron F-4D Phantom II at Phu Cat Air Base, c. 1969–71

The squadron deployed to Da Nang Air Base, South Vietnam, on 5 February 1966 as the USAF built up its forces there. There, it was assigned to the 2d Air Division and attached to the 6252d Tactical Fighter Wing at Da Nang. In April, Seventh Air Force replaced the 2d Air Division and the 35th Tactical Fighter Wing replaced the 6252d. Then in October, the squadron returned to the 366th Wing as the wing moved to Da Nang. From there, the squadron carried out operations over North Vietnam, South Vietnam and Laos. Its primary mission was to support Operation Rolling Thunder, providing cover for the Republic F-105 Thunderchiefs carrying out the strike missions. The squadron was the first to shoot down a Mikoyan-Gurevich MiG-21 during the Vietnam War. While at Da Nang Air Base, the squadron scored eight additional MiG kills.

The 480th converted to the F-4D by May 1968. On 15 April 1969, the squadron moved to Phu Cat Air Base, South Vietnam where it was reassigned to the 37th Tactical Fighter Wing, as the remainder of the 366th Wing converted to the F-4E. With the continued drawdown of United States forces from Vietnam, the 37th was inactivated and its assets were transferred to the 12th Tactical Fighter Wing, which moved without personnel or equipment from Cam Ranh Bay Air Base on 1 April 1970. While at Phu Cat the 480th flew close air support, air interdiction, and Operation Ranch Hand escort missions over South Vietnam, Cambodia and Laos. It also flew gunship escort and combat air patrol missions for Boeing B-52 Stratofortresses over Laos, and a limited number of strike/air interdiction missions over North Vietnam in Route Package One. The 480th was inactivated on 17 November 1971 and its aircraft redistributed to other units in Southeast Asia as Phu Cat was transferred to the Republic of Vietnam Air Force.

==== Medal of Honor ====
In November 1967, a member of the squadron, Captain Lance Sijan, ejected from his disabled aircraft and was badly injured in North Vietnam. Despite his injuries, he evaded enemy forces for more than 40 days. After was captured, although emaciated and crippled, he overpowered one of his guards and crawled into the jungle, only to be recaptured after several hours. He was then kept in solitary confinement and interrogated at length. During his interrogation, he was severely tortured. Captain Sijan lapsed into delirium and was placed in the care of another prisoner. Captain Sijan later died in a prison camp and in 1976 was posthumously awarded the Medal of Honor.

=== Operations from Spangdahlem ===
==== First Activation ====
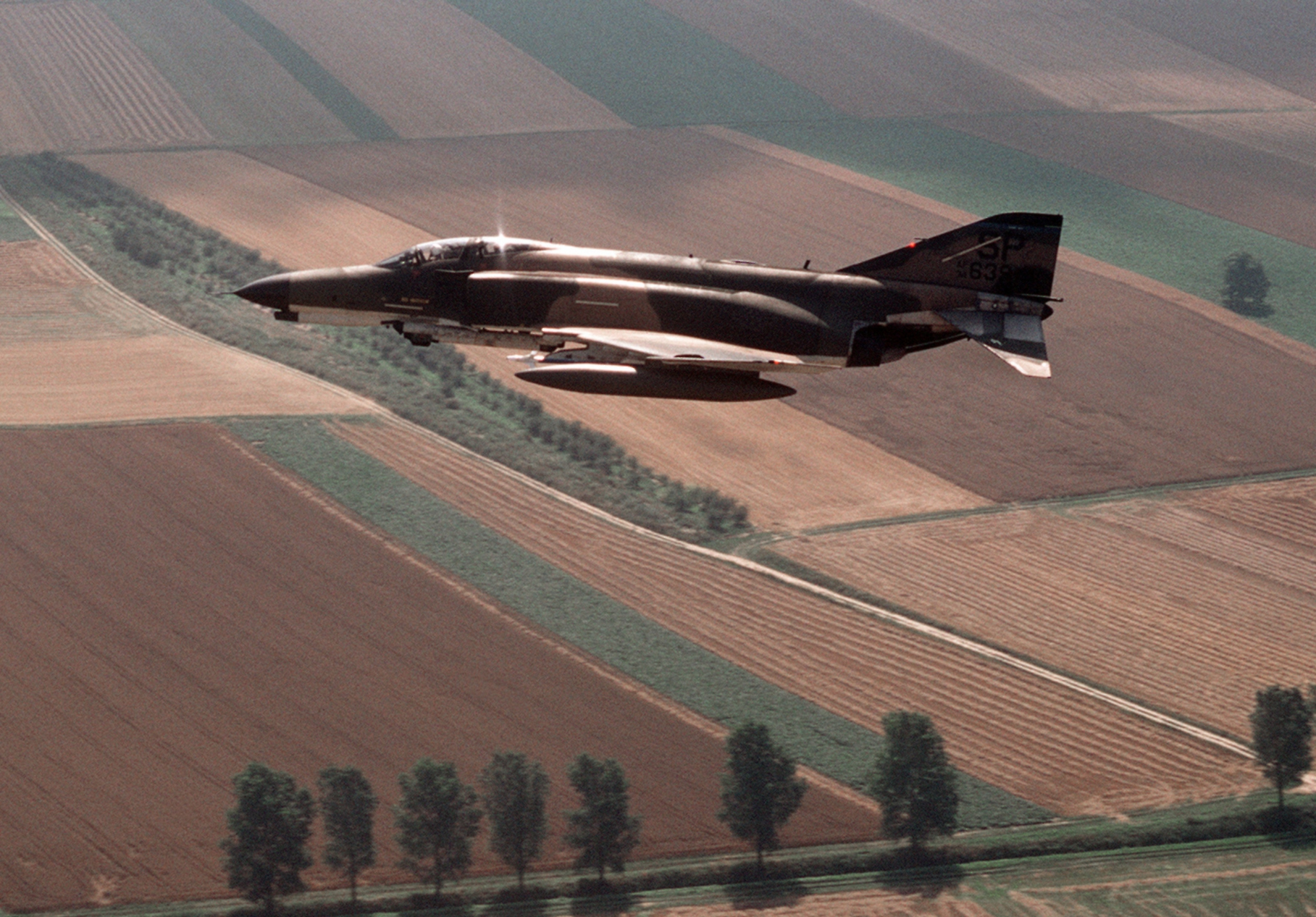
F-4E Phantom II of the squadron over West Germany, 1982 (Note: Aircraft is McDonnell Douglas F-4E-62-MC, serial 74-1639. This plane ended its life as a battle damage repair trainer from 1 October 1990 until it was salvaged in October 1992. Baugher, Joe (4 September 2023). "1974 USAF Serial Numbers". Joe Baugher.)

The 480th was reactivated on 15 November 1976 as part of the 52nd Tactical Fighter Wing at Spangdahlem Air Base, Germany, again flying the F-4D Phantom II. It maintained an operationally ready nuclear and conventional strike capability. In 1979, the Warhawks converted to the F-4E Phantom II.

In late 1983, the entire 52nd Wing was tasked with the Suppression of Enemy Air Defenses (SEAD) mission. Each squadron was equipped with eight F-4G Advanced Wild Weasel hunter aircraft and 16 F-4E Phantom II killers. On 19 September 1985, the 480th Bombardment and Air Resupply Squadrons were consolidated with the squadron. In April 1987, the 480th began receiving the General Dynamics F-16C Fighting Falcon to replace its aging F-4Es in the killer role.

In late 1990, the 480th deployed aircraft and aircrews to the Middle East to support Operation Desert Shield. When deployed, its crews and aircraft were assigned to the Tactical Fighter Squadron, Provisional, 81st. Its deployed crews flew SEAD missions between 17 January and 11 April 1991 as part of Operation Desert Storm. Post-Desert Storm, the squadron's F-4Gs were transferred to the 81st Tactical Fighter Squadron leaving the 480th with only F-16s and changing its mission from SEAD to air defense. In October 1991, the squadron was redesignated as the 480th Fighter Squadron.

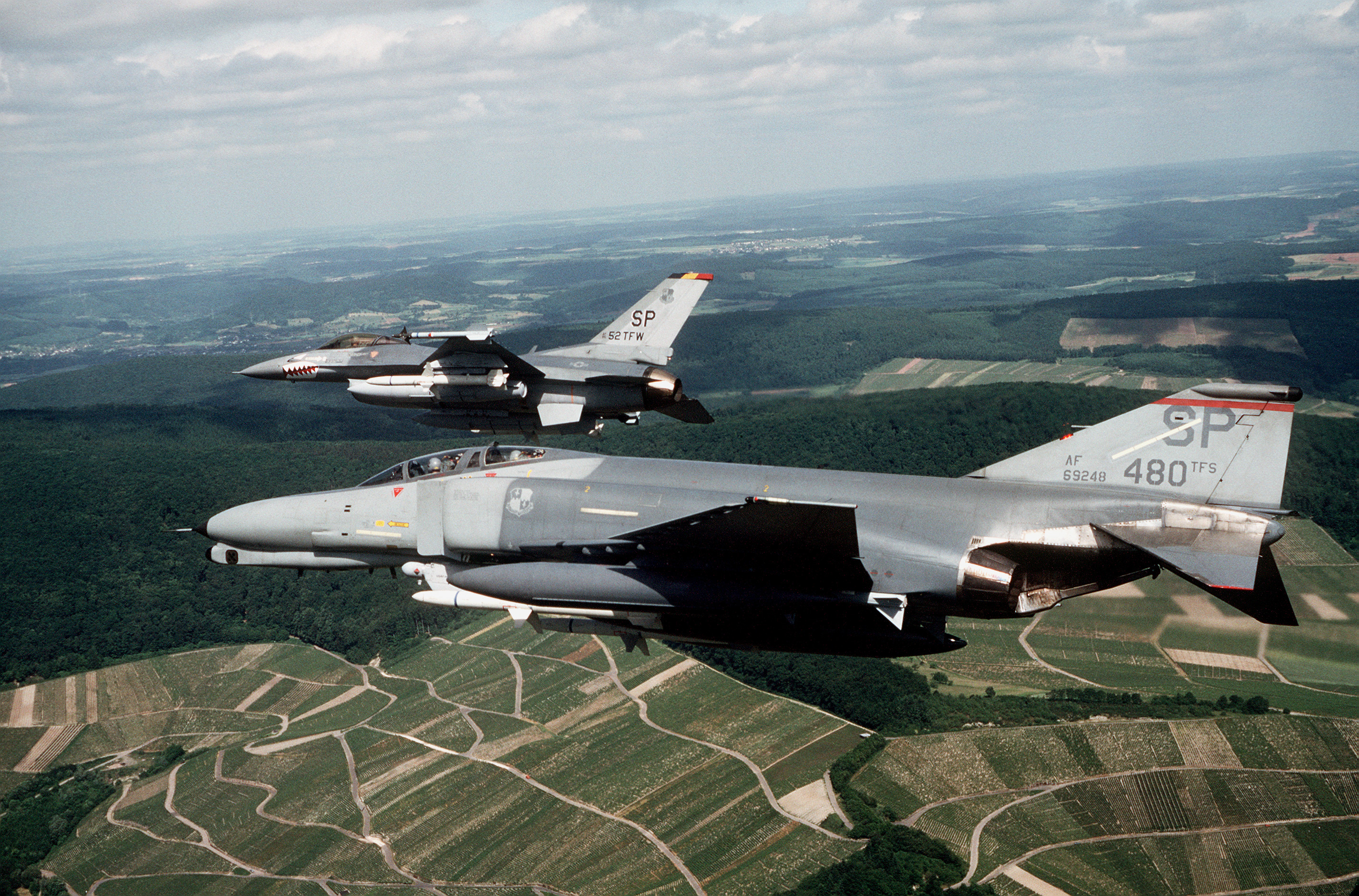
Squadron F-4G Wild Weasel and 52nd Wing commander's F-16C Fighting Falcon over Germany, 1989 (Note: Aircraft are McDonnell Douglas F-4G-MC Phantom II, serial 69-0248 (built as F-4E-42-MC and modified as an F-4G in 1982. It was converted to a QF-4G target drone and shot down by a Patriot missile on 6 June 2002) and General Dynamics F-16C Block 30B Fighting Falcon, serial 85-1552 (later assigned to the squadron). Baugher, Joe (10 June 2023). "1985 USAF Serial Numbers". Joe Baugher. Baugher, Joe (10 June 2023). "1969 USAF Serial Numbers". Joe Baugher.)

In June 1993, the squadron received its first F-16CJ Block 50 SEAD planes. The Warhawks became the USAF's first squadron to be equipped with the Block 50 F-16s. A little over a month later, it began transferring its F-16C and D Block 30 aircraft to the 178th Fighter Group of the Ohio Air National Guard. On 1 April 1994, the squadron was inactivated again, and transferred its personnel and equipment to the 22nd Fighter Squadron, which relocated to Spangdahlem from Bitburg Air Base without personnel or equipment the same day.

==== Second activation ====
In April 2010, the 52nd Fighter Wing's strength was reduced by one third when 20 F-16CJs and one F-16D were transferred to the 179th Fighter Squadron of the Minnesota Air National Guard. As a result of the drawdown of F-16s, the 22nd and 23rd Fighter Squadrons were inactivated on 13 August 2010 and transferred their personnel and equipment to the reactivated 480th Fighter Squadron. The reformed squadron retained the primary SEAD role of its previous incarnation.

Pilots who did not deploy for Operation Inherent Resolve were impacted by the 2013 United States budget sequestration which grounded the squadron in April and led to multiple losses of flying currency. It was not until August 2013 that flying resumed and pilots at Spangdahlem regained the required proficiency in the F-16, and only with the help of instructor pilots from the 510th Fighter Squadron.

===== Expeditionary operations =====
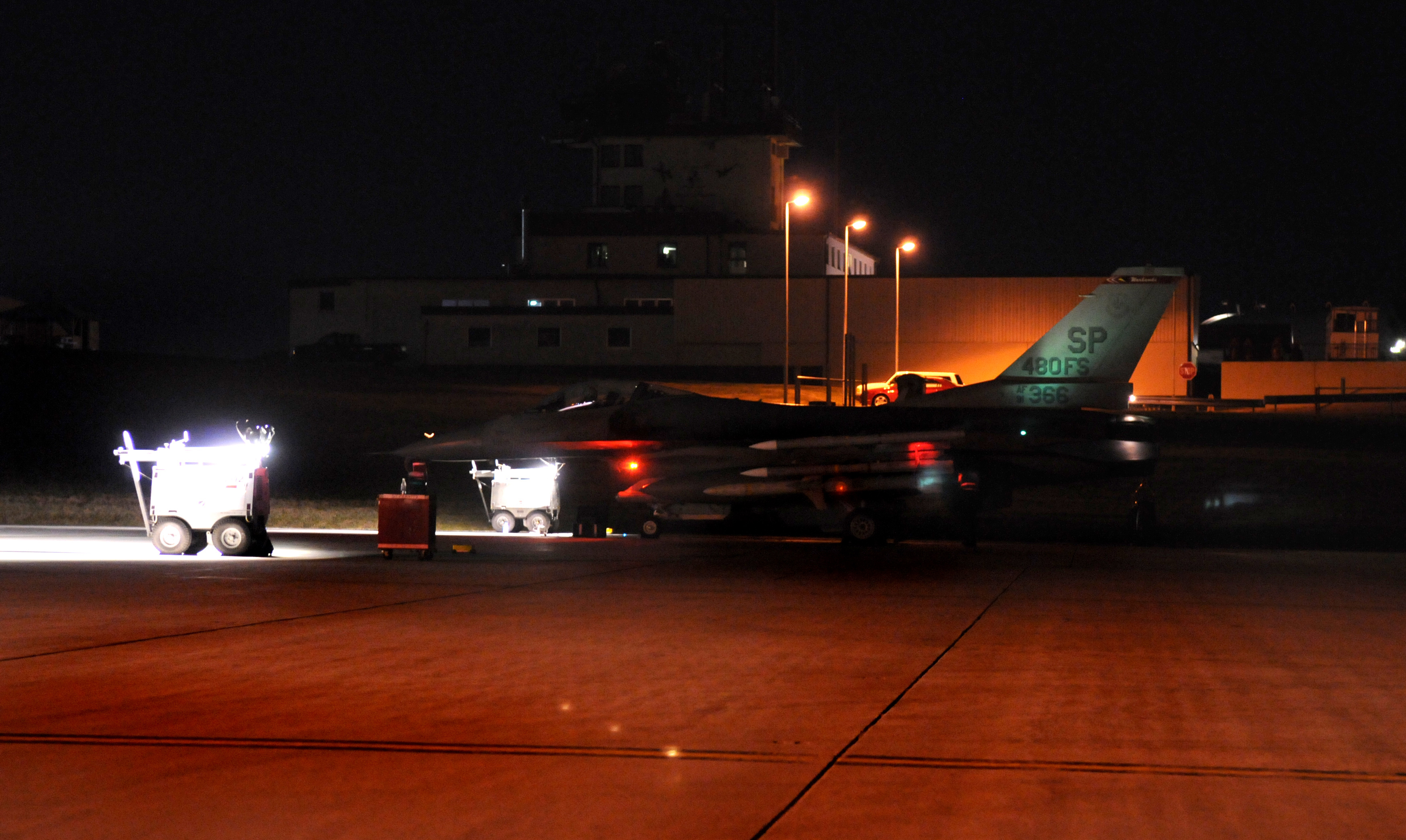
Squadron Fighting Falcons prepare to deploy to Aviano Air Base for Operation Odyssey Dawn (Note: Aircraft is General Dynamics F-16C Block 50D Fighting Falcon, serial 91-0366. Photo taken on 19 March 2011. This aircraft crashed on 11 August 2015 near Engelmannreuth, Germany. Baugher, Joe (11 July 2023). "1991 USAF Serial Numbers". Joe Baugher.)

In March 2011, the Warhawks deployed personnel and F-16s to Aviano Air Base, Italy, to form the 480th Expeditionary Fighter Squadron to support Operation Odyssey Dawn, flying cover for strike aircraft. (Note: Expeditionary squadrons are temporary (provisional) and once inactivated, their lineage ceases. However, when they earn awards or campaign credit, this is bestowed on the permanent unit that is their major force provider, and after which they are named. Air Force Instruction 38-101, Manpower and Organization, 29 August 2019, paras. 31.2.2.2 and 31.4.) They flew their first sortie on 21 March 2011, tasked with SEAD. On 2 May 2011, squadron members formed the 480th Expeditionary Fighter Squadron, which was activated in Iraq as part of Operation New Dawn. Returning in November, the 480th was the last fighter unit to support Operation New Dawn. It flew cover for ground convoys and performed armed reconnaissance ahead of advancing ground forces. The squadron's F-16s flew 2,259 sorties with a total of 9,000 flying hours during its deployment to Iraq.

In April 2013, the 480th Expeditionary Fighter Squadron was activated at Kandahar Airfield, Afghanistan, for six months to support Operation Enduring Freedom. The squadron flew search and rescue operations in addition to its SEAD mission.

On 7 April 2016, squadron members formed the 480th Expeditionary Fighter Squadron in Southwest Asia to support Operation Inherent Resolve, flying close air support missions. During its six month deployment it flew more sorties than any previous comparable squadron returning to Spangdahlem on 12 October.

The squadron has frequently deployed personnel and F-16s to participate in combined exercises with friendly air forces. In October 2010, the 480th deployed for the first time to Graf Ignatievo Air Base in Bulgaria to train with Mikoyan MiG-29s of the Bulgarian Air Force in Exercise Thracian Star 2010.

In March 2012, it deployed to Konya Air Base to take part in Exercise Anatolian Eagle 2012 with the Turkish Air Force, practicing SEAD. On 9 November 2012, the 52nd Operations Group set up a detachment (52nd Operations Group, Detachment 1) at Lask Air Base, Poland. On 30 May 2014, the 480th deployed personnel and aircraft to support the detachment at Lask for two weeks, participating with Polish forces in Exercise Eagle Talon.

In preparing for their 2016 deployment to support Operation Inherent Resolve, squadron members flew with the Hellenic Air Force in exercises at Souda Air Base, Greece. Its preparation also included participation in Exercise Red Flag 15-3.

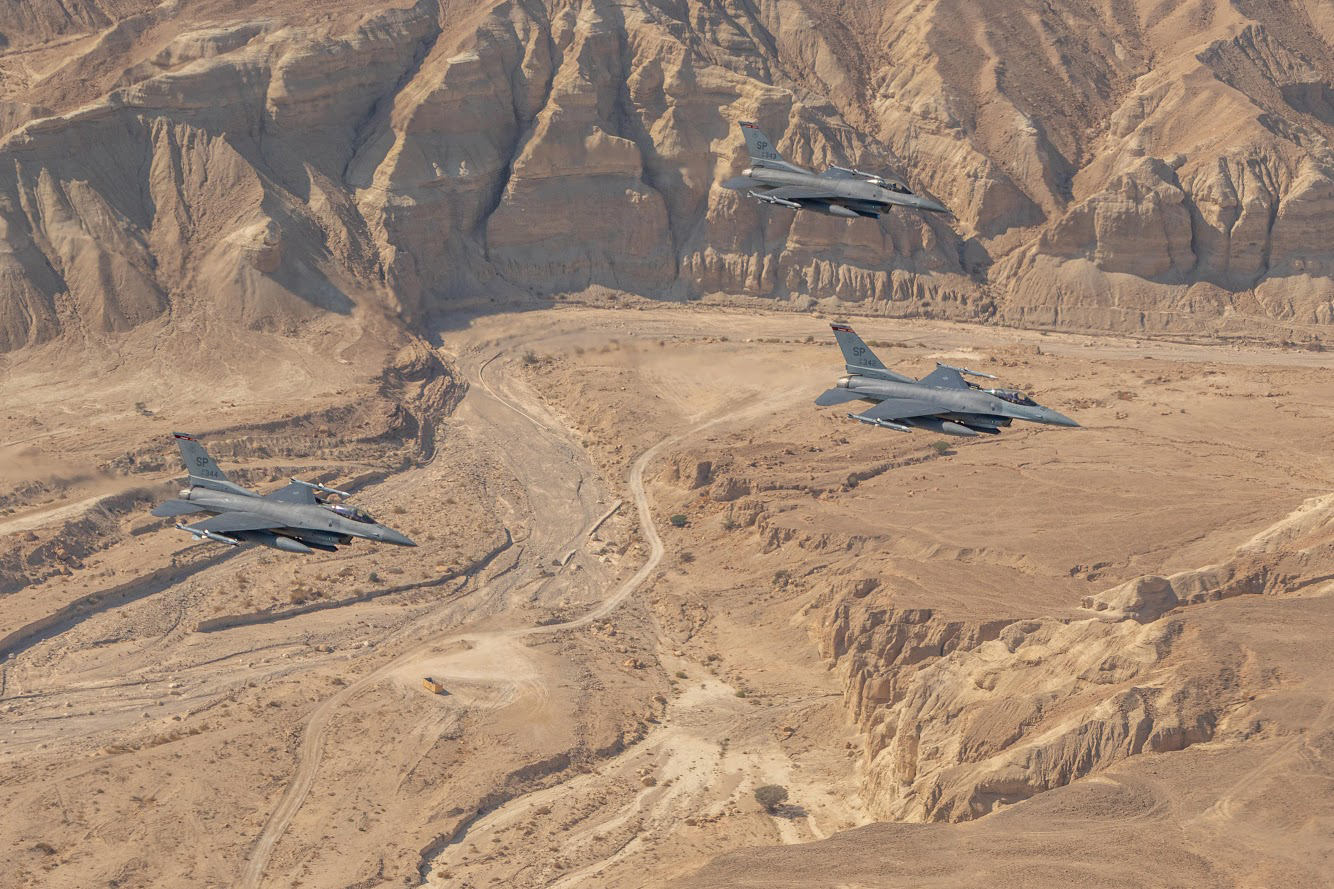
Three 480th EFS F-16CJ Fighting Falcons flying over Israel during Exercise Blue Flag, 2019

From 2 to 22 February 2019, the Warhawks deployed 18 F-16s to Monte Real Air Base, Portugal, to operate alongside F-16 squadrons (Esquadra 201 and Esquadra 301) of the Portuguese Air Force. The 480th Expeditionary Fighter Squadron was activated at Uvda Air Base in Israel between 3 and 14 November 2019 to participate in Israeli Exercise Blue Flag 2019.

On 25 October 2024, amid rising tensions in the 2024 Iran–Israel conflict, CENTCOM announced that they were deploying F-16 fighters from the 480th to the Middle East.

=== Future ===
On 29 July 2020, the Department of Defense announced that the 480th would be moved from Spangdahlem to Aviano Air Base, Italy as part of a plan to withdraw forces from Germany. The plans to move the squadron have been put on hold as the Biden administration reviews the Trump administration's plans to move the squadron to Italy.

== Lineage ==
480th Bombardment Squadron

- Constituted as the 480th Bombardment Squadron (Medium) on 9 July 1942

Activated on 15 July 1942
Disbanded on 1 May 1944

- Reconstituted and consolidated with the 480th Air Resupply Squadron and the 480th Tactical Fighter Squadron as the 480th Tactical Fighter Squadron on 19 September 1985

480th Air Resupply Squadron

- Constituted as the 580th Aerial Resupply Squadron on 15 March 1951

Activated on 16 April 1951
Redesignated 580th Air Resupply Squadron on 5 November 1951
Inactivated on 18 October 1956
Redesignated 480th Air Resupply Squadron on 31 July 1985

- Consolidated with the 480th Bombardment Squadron and the 480th Tactical Fighter Squadron as the 480th Tactical Fighter Squadron on 19 September 1985

480th Fighter Squadron

- Constituted as the 480th Fighter-Bomber Squadron on 1 September 1957

Activated on 25 September 1957

- Redesignated 480th Tactical Fighter Squadron on 1 July 1958

Inactivated on 1 April 1959

- Activated on 30 April 1962 (not organized)

Organized on 8 May 1962
Inactivated on 17 November 1971

- Activated on 15 November 1976
- Consolidated with the 480th Air Resupply Squadron and the 480th Bombardment Squadron on 19 September 1985

Redesignated 480th Fighter Squadron on 1 October 1991
Inactivated on 1 April 1994

- Activated on 13 August 2010

=== Assignments ===
- 336th Bombardment Group, 15 July 1942 – 1 May 1944
- 580th Air Resupply and Communications Group (later 580th Air Resupply Group), 16 April 1951 – 18 October 1956
- 366th Fighter-Bomber Wing (later 366th Tactical Fighter Wing), 25 September 1957 – 1 April 1959 (not operational after 4 March 1959)
- United States Air Forces Europe, 30 April 1962 (not organized)
- 366th Tactical Fighter Wing, 8 May 1962
- 2d Air Division, 5 February 1966 (attached to 6252d Tactical Fighter Wing)
- Seventh Air Force, 1 April 1966 (attached to 6252d Tactical Fighter Wing until 7 April 1966, then to 35th Tactical Fighter Wing)
- 35th Tactical Fighter Wing, 23 June 1966
- 366th Tactical Fighter Wing, 10 October 1966
- 37th Tactical Fighter Wing, 15 April 1969
- 12th Tactical Fighter Wing, 31 March 1970 – 17 November 1971
- 52d Tactical Fighter Wing (later 52d Fighter Wing), 15 November 1976
- 52nd Operations Group, 31 March 1992 – 1 April 1994
- 52nd Operations Group, 13 August 2010 – present

=== Stations ===
- MacDill Field, Florida, 15 July 1942
- Fort Myers Army Air Field, Florida, 10 August 1942
- Avon Park Army Air Field, Florida, 13 December 1942
- MacDill Field, Florida, 13 October 1943
- Lake Charles Army Air Field, Louisiana, 6 November 1943 – 1 May 1944
- Mountain Home Air Force Base, Idaho, 16 April 1951 – 19 September 1952
- Wheelus Field (later Wheelus Air Base), Libya, 28 September 1952 – 18 October 1956
- Alexandria Air Force Base (later England Air Force Base), Louisiana, 25 September 1957
- Chaumont Air Base, France, 8 May 1962
- Phalsbourg Air Base, France, 21 December 1962
- Holloman Air Force Base, New Mexico, 12 July 1963
- Da Nang Air Base, South Vietnam, 5 February 1966 (deployed to Korat Royal Thai Air Force Base, Thailand, 21–24 May 1966)
- Phu Cat Air Base, South Vietnam, 15 April 1969 – 17 November 1971
- Spangdahlem Air Base, Germany, 15 November 1976 – 1 April 1994
- Spangdahlem Air Base, Germany, 13 August 2010 – present

=== Aircraft ===
- Martin B-26 Marauder (1942–1944)
- Boeing B-29 Superfortress (1951–1956)
- Fairchild C-119 Flying Boxcar (1951–1956)
- Grumman SA-16 Albatross (1951–1956)
- North American F-100D Super Sabre (1957–1959)
- North American F-100F Super Sabre (1957–1959)
- Republic F-84F Thunderstreak (1958–1959) (1962–1965)
- McDonnell F-4C Phantom II (1965–1968)
- McDonnell Douglas F-4D Phantom II (1968–1971; 1976–1979)
- McDonnell Douglas F-4E Phantom II (1979–1987)
- McDonnell Douglas F-4G Wild Weasel V (1983–1991)
- General Dynamics F-16C/D Fighting Falcon (1987–1994; 2010–present)

=== Awards and campaigns ===
Award streamer	Award	Dates	Notes
	Presidential Unit Citation	23 April – 1 August 1967	Vietnam, 480th Tactical Fighter Squadron
	Presidential Unit Citation	8 February – 8 April 1971	Vietnam, 480th Tactical Fighter Squadron
	Air Force Meritorious Unit Award	1 June 2010 – 31 May 2011	480th Expeditionary Fighter Squadron (bestowed)
	Air Force Meritorious Unit Award	1 June 2011 – 1 October 2011	480th Expeditionary Fighter Squadron (bestowed)
	Air Force Meritorious Unit Award	7 April 2016 – 2 May 2016	480th Expeditionary Fighter Squadron (bestowed)
	Air Force Meritorious Unit Award	15 June 2016 – 10 October 2016	480th Expeditionary Fighter Squadron (bestowed)
	Air Force Outstanding Unit Award with Combat "V" Device	[5 Feb 1966] – 31 March 1967	480th Tactical Fighter Squadron
	Air Force Outstanding Unit Award with Combat "V" Device	1 April 1967 – 31 March 1968	480th Tactical Fighter Squadron
	Air Force Outstanding Unit Award with Combat "V" Device	1 April 1968 – 31 March 1969	480th Tactical Fighter Squadron
	Air Force Outstanding Unit Award with Combat "V" Device	1 April 1969 – 31 March 1970	480th Tactical Fighter Squadron
	Air Force Outstanding Unit Award with Combat "V" Device	1 April 1970 – 31 March 1971	480th Tactical Fighter Squadron
	Air Force Outstanding Unit Award with Combat "V" Device	1 September 1990 – 26 February 1991	480th Tactical Fighter Squadron
	Air Force Outstanding Unit Award	1 July 1978 – 30 June 1980	480th Tactical Fighter Squadron
	Air Force Outstanding Unit Award	1 July 1991 – 30 June 1993	480th Tactical Fighter Squadron (later 480th Fighter Squadron)
	Vietnamese Gallantry Cross with Palm	1 April 1966 – 17 November 1971	480th Tactical Fighter Squadron
	Vietnamese Gallantry Cross with Palm	31 March 1970 – 10 November 1971	480th Tactical Fighter Squadron

Campaign Streamer	Campaign	Dates	Notes
	American Theater without inscription	15 July 1942 – 1 May 1944	480th Bombardment Squadron
	Vietnam Air	5 February 1966 – 28 June 1966	480th Tactical Fighter Squadron
	Vietnam Air Offensive	29 June 1966 – 8 March 1967	480th Tactical Fighter Squadron
	Vietnam Air Offensive, Phase II	9 March 1967 – 31 March 1968	480th Tactical Fighter Squadron
	Vietnam Air/Ground	22 January 1968 – 7 July 1968	480th Tactical Fighter Squadron
	Vietnam Air Offensive, Phase III	1 April 1968 – 31 October 1968	480th Tactical Fighter Squadron
	Vietnam Air Offensive, Phase IV	1 November 1968 – 22 February 1969	480th Tactical Fighter Squadron
	Tet 1969/Counteroffensive	23 February 1969 – 8 June 1969	480th Tactical Fighter Squadron
	Vietnam Summer-Fall 1969	9 June 1969 – 31 October 1969	480th Tactical Fighter Squadron
	Vietnam Winter-Spring 1970	3 November 1969 – 30 April 1970	480th Tactical Fighter Squadron
	Sanctuary Counteroffensive	1 May 1970 – 30 June 1970	480th Tactical Fighter Squadron
	Southwest Monsoon	1 July 1970 – 30 November 1970	480th Tactical Fighter Squadron
	Commando Hunt V	1 December 1970 – 14 May 1971	480th Tactical Fighter Squadron
	Commando Hunt VI	15 May 1971 – 31 July 1971	480th Tactical Fighter Squadron
	Commando Hunt VII	1 November 1971 – 17 November 1971	480th Tactical Fighter Squadron
	Southwest Asia Cease-Fire	12 April 1991 – 1 April 1994	480th Tactical Fighter Squadron (later 480th Fighter Squadron)
	New Dawn	1 September 2010 – 31 December 2011	480th Fighter Squadron

== See also ==
- List of United States Air Force fighter squadrons
- List of Martin B-26 Marauder operators
- List of F-100 units of the United States Air Force
- List of F-4 Phantom II operators
- General Dynamics F-16 Fighting Falcon operators
