= Neuburg Air Base =

Neuburg Air Base Fliegerhorst Neuburg
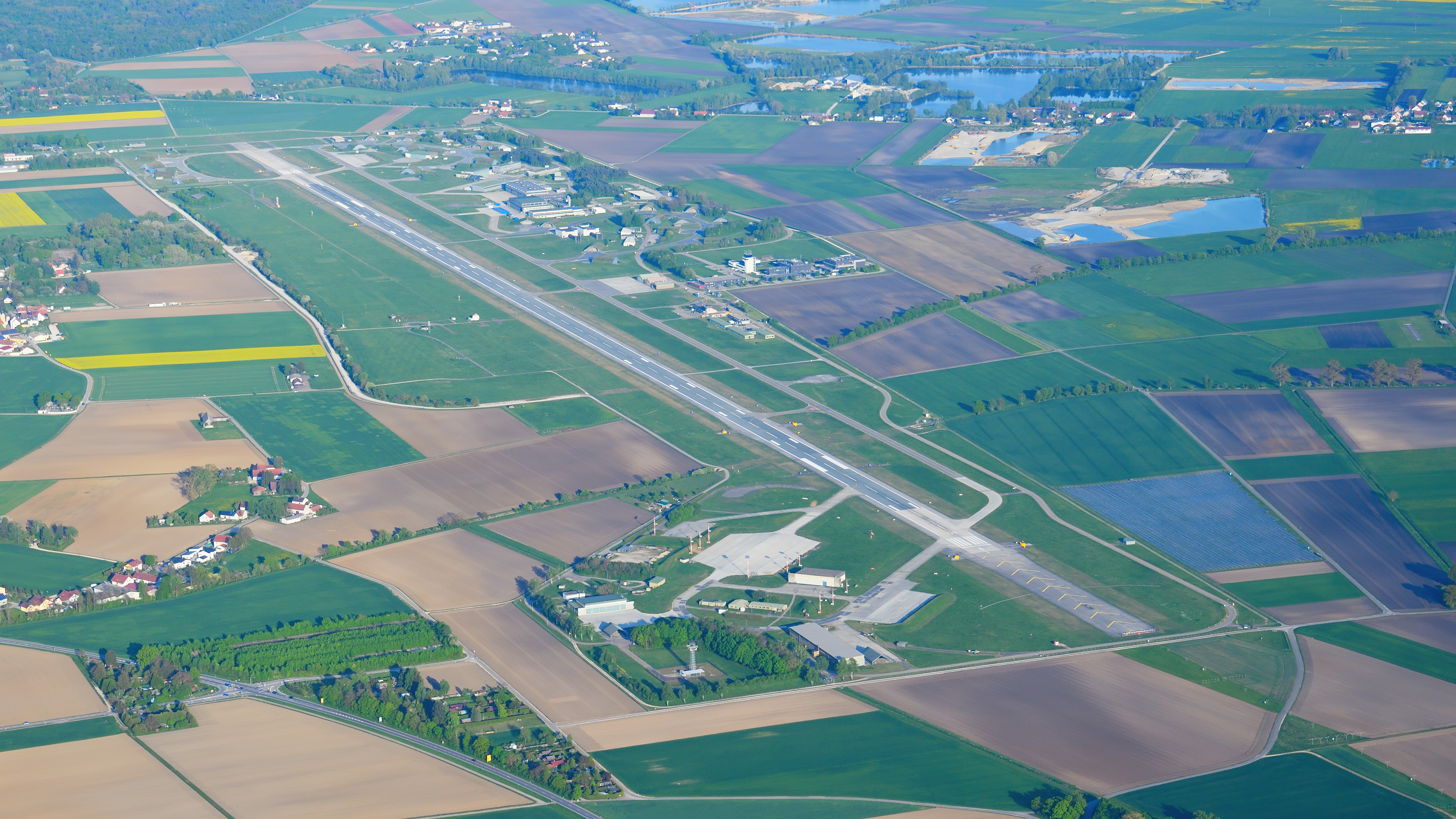
- IATA: none; ICAO: ETSN

Summary
- Airport type: Military
- Operator: German Air Force
- Location: Neuburg an der Donau
- Elevation AMSL: 1,249 ft (381 m)
- Coordinates: 48°42′42″N 11°12′42″E
- Interactive map of Neuburg Air Base

Runways
Direction	Length		Surface
Direction	ft	m	Surface
09/27	8,005	2,440	Asphalt

Neuburg Air Base is a military air base in Germany. It is located in the district of Neuburg-Schrobenhausen on the River Danube, approximately 20 km west-southwest of Ingolstadt. Its primary user is Jagdgeschwader 74 (JG 74 for short, Fighter Wing 74 in English) of the German Air Force (Luftwaffe), which provides air defence for Southern Germany. Since 2006 Eurofighter Typhoons have been operated from the base. Although Neuburg is the smallest fighter aircraft base in the Bundeswehr, the air base was virtually unaffected by the Bundeswehr reform announced in 2011.

== History ==
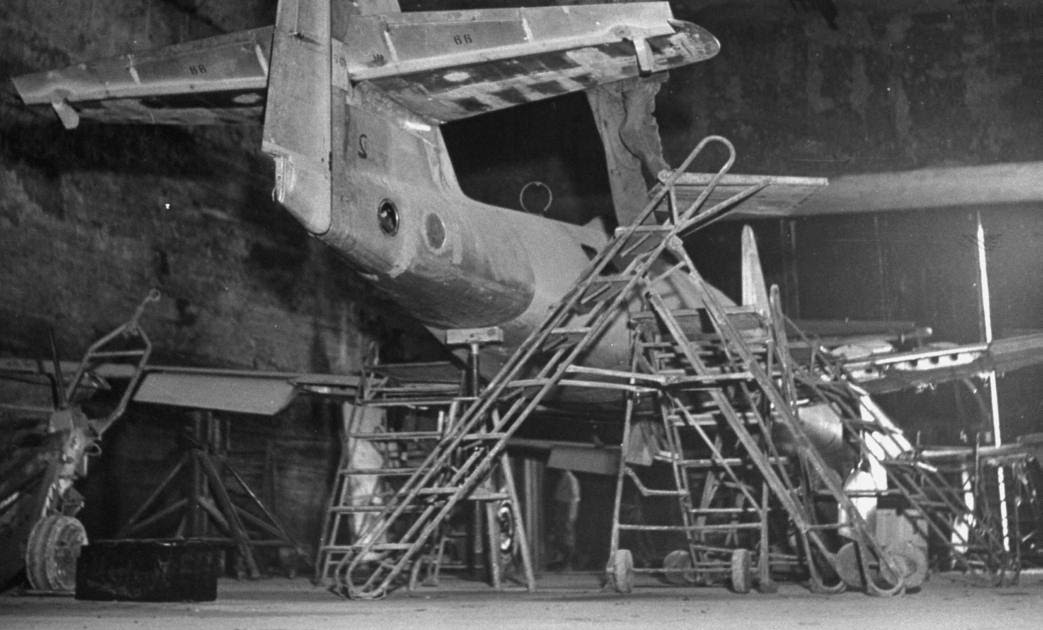
Underground manufacture of Me 262s near Kahla, Thuringia

The history of military aviation in Neuburg dates back to 1912, when a military aircraft landed in the drill square in Neuburg for the first time.

In 1935 construction of the base started. In 1937, the base was designated as the "Aviation Weapons School". It was equipped with Dornier Do 23s, Focke-Wulf Fw 56s, and Junkers Ju 52s. Close to the end of World War II, Neuburg also served as a base and construction facility for the jet-driven Me 262 fighter aircraft. On 19 March 1945 the Neuburg jet plant was bombed by B-24 Liberators of the USAAF 392d Bombardment Group. After being taken over by the Americans, the airfield received the Allied Code designation R-60.

The airfield was part of the major manoeuvre from 12 to 23 June 2023, held under the leadership of the German Air Force Air Defender 23; it was the biggest exercise of air forces since the formation of NATO was announced.
