= NATO strategy in the Arctic =

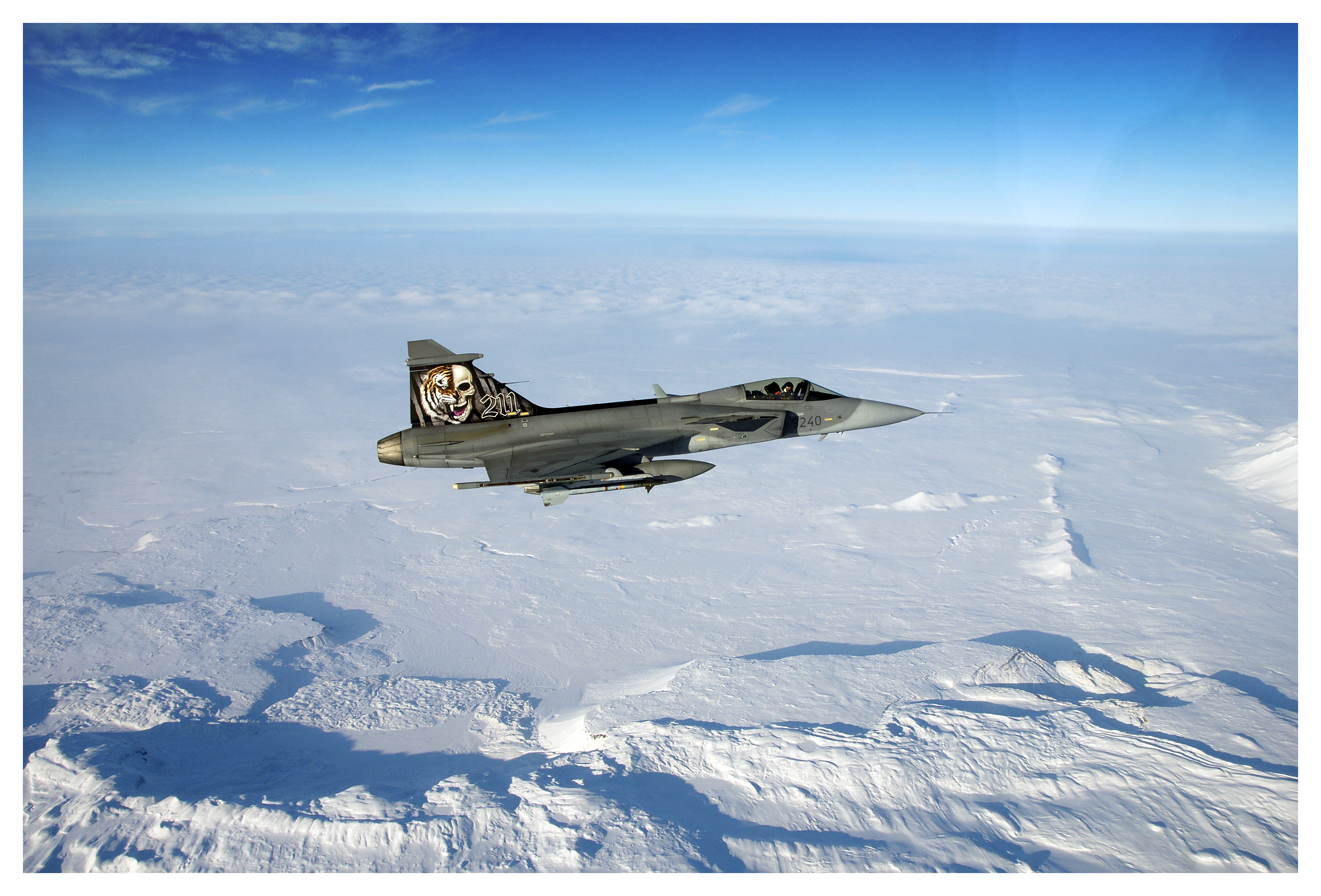
A Czech Saab 39 Gripen during an Icelandic Air Policing deployment in 2014

The North Atlantic Treaty Organization's (NATO) strategy in the Arctic refers to the Alliance’s approach to security, presence, and cooperation in the Arctic region. During the Cold War, the Arctic was strategically important for NATO, but following the end of the conflict, NATO’s approach to the region became more limited, cautious, and cooperative.

Following 21st century geopolitical developments, climate change, and increased international activity, attention towards the Arctic renewed. Russia’s military presence, growing interest from non-Arctic states, and the changing environmental conditions have contributed to NATO’s reengagement in the Arctic. The accession of Finland and Sweden to NATO has altered the regional security landscape, as most Arctic states are now NATO members, contributing to an ongoing reassessment of NATO’s approach to the Arctic.

== Background ==
Climate change and the subsequent increased accessibility to natural resources have contributed to international interest in the Arctic, which is one of several reasons for NATO’s engagement in the area. Another commonly cited reason is that a sustained NATO presence may help reduce the risk of escalating tensions, particularly by avoiding the destabilizing effects that could result from a sudden significant change in NATO’s level of engagement in the Arctic. Another reason influencing NATO’s engagement is the region’s challenging operating environment. The complex weather conditions and the unpredictable effects of climate change increase the difficulty of military activities in the Arctic, making a long-term presence crucial for effective operations.

NATO’s presence in the Arctic region is vital due to the extensive coastlines of NATO’s member states in the area, particularly those of Greenland, Iceland, and the United Kingdom (the GIUK Gap), and northern Norway. The security of NATO’s Arctic member state coastlines is essential, as they secure the supply route between North America and Europe.

== Strategy ==
NATO’s previous approach to the Arctic was characterized by a limited presence and caution. Following the end of the Cold War, NATO’s strategic interest in the Arctic region disappeared. NATO’s limited engagement approach was explicitly addressed by the former NATO General Secretary, Anders Fogh Rasmussen, in 2013. NATO’s cautious stance in the Arctic was made into a slogan by the northern member states, saying: “High North – Low Tension”, reflecting an emphasis on stability and cooperation in the region. The Alliance’s approach was shaped by internal disagreements among member states. Particularly, Canada was against NATO’s presence in the Arctic region, as it feared it could undermine the regional cooperation with Russia.

=== Adaptation ===
NATO’s earlier strategic approach to the Arctic is widely regarded as outdated with increased attention to the region from Russia and China, as well as the growing impact of climate change. Following Russia’s invasion of Ukraine in 2022, both Finland and Sweden applied for and were granted NATO membership, which significantly altered NATO’s position in the Arctic. Their accession marked a shift in the region’s security landscape, as six out of the seven Arctic states are now members of NATO.

As Russia’s focus shifted towards the war in Ukraine, NATO, strengthened by its new members, expanded its presence and engagement in the Arctic. The Alliance has increasingly framed the region as a security concern, which enables greater military planning and development.

The development of NATO’s strategy in the Arctic is influenced by broader geopolitical competition, power battles in other regions, and the effects of climate change, which have increased international attention on the Arctic.

In summary, NATO’s strategic adaptation in the Arctic remains ongoing, as the Alliance has yet to adopt a concrete and collective Arctic strategy.

== Future development ==
NATO’s future development in the Arctic is shaped by evolving regional conditions and is widely discussed in terms of a broader adaptation of NATO’s Arctic strategy. The accession of Finland and Sweden has expanded NATO’s expertise in the region, enabling enhanced collective planning and operational coordination in the Arctic. The increased capacity for collective operationalization may become crucial, as the United States’ strategic focus turns toward the Indo-Pacific region.
