= 301 Squadron (Portugal) =

- Esquadra 301
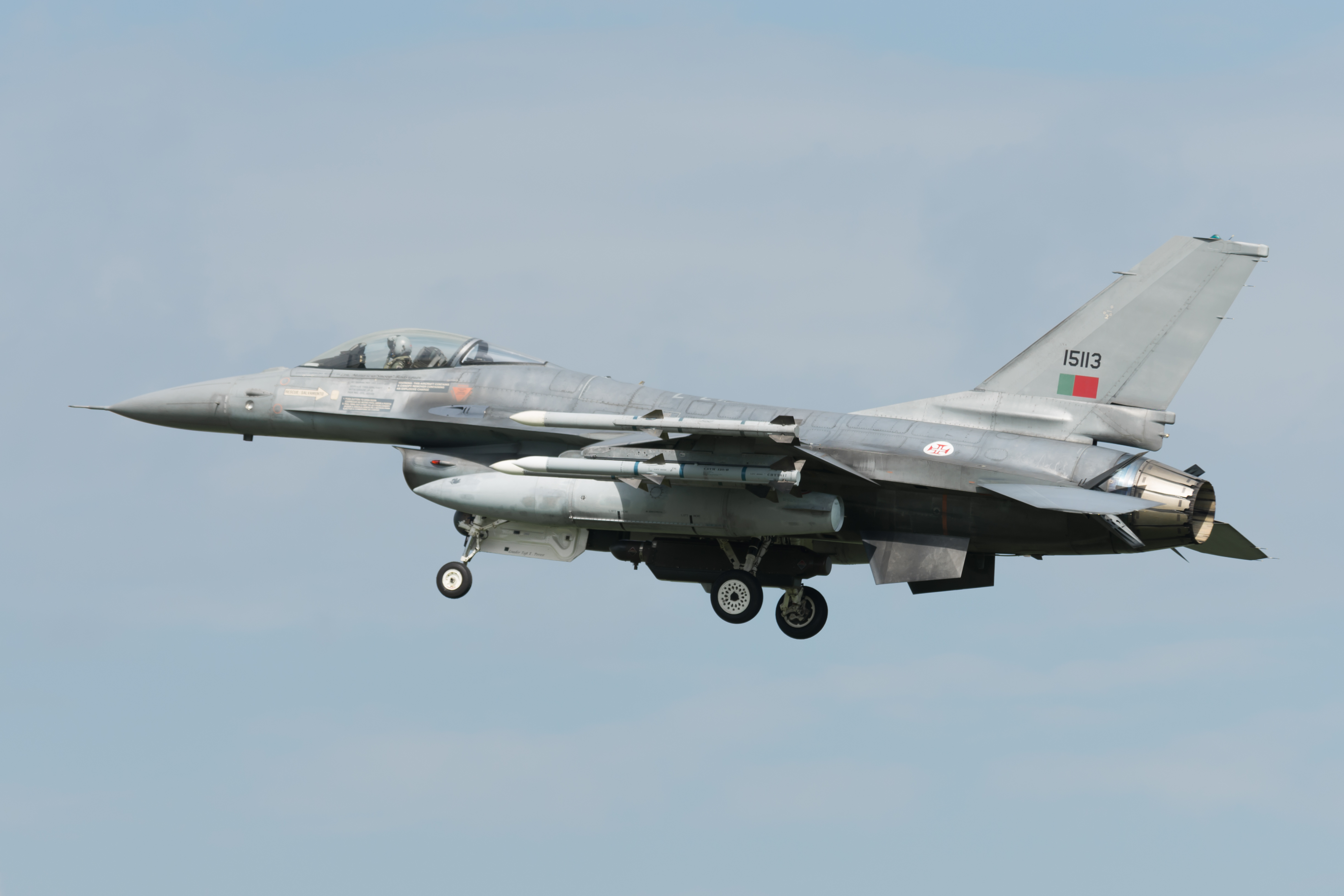
- Portuguese Air Force Lockheed Martin F-16A Block 20 MLU
- Active: 1978
- Country: Portugal
- Branch: Air Force
- Air Base: Air Base 6 (1978–1993); Air Base 11 (1993–2005); Air Base 5 (2005–present)
- Nickname(s): Jaguares (Jaguars)
- Motto(s): De nada a forte gente se temia (The Strong People Nothing Feared)
- Mascot(s): Jaguar

Commanders
- Current commander: Maj. Duarte Freitas

Insignia
- Badge: Jaguar's head

Aircraft flown
- Attack: Alpha Jet (1993–2005)
- Fighter: Fiat G-91 (1978–1993); F-16 Fighting Falcon

The 301 Squadron "Jaguares" (Esquadra 301) is a fighter squadron of the Portuguese Air Force (PoAF).

== Roles and missions ==
The 301 Squadron has the mission of executing operations of air defense and conventional attack in all-weather conditions.

- Operations of air defense in all-weather conditions
  - Air defense operations (DCA)
  - Offensive counter air operations (OCA)
  - Air defense in support of maritime operations (Defense TASMO)
- Operations of conventional attack in all-weather conditions
  - Anti-surface air operations (ASFAO)
  - Anti-air combat operations (CA)

== History ==
Activated with the designation 301 Squadron in 1978, the origins of the "Jaguares" squadron dates back to the former Portuguese Air Force squadrons that operated the Fiat G-91 Gina between 1965 and 1993. During the Portuguese Colonial War these squadrons executed more than 13,000 operational missions, with five aircraft having been shot down by anti-aircraft artillery (AAA) and surface-to-air missiles (SAM).

In August 1974, in the post-revolution period, the transfer of the Fiat G-91 aircraft from Air Base 5, in Monte Real, and of all air bases in the Portuguese African colonies to Air Base 6, in Montijo was initiated. The 62 Squadron was then created to operate the Fiat G-91.

With the reorganization of the Air Force's aerial units, in 1978, the squadron's designation was changed to 301 Squadron, thus assigning as its primary mission the execution of operations of close air support (CAS), air interdiction (IA) and tactical air reconnaissance, as well as its secondary mission the execution of actions of tactical air support for maritime operations (TASMO) and of air defense operations (DCA).

On June 27, 1993, with the last flight of the Fiat G-91 in service with the Portuguese Air Force, and the subsequent retirement of this aircraft, as well the recent restructuring of the PoAF, the 301 Squadron was transferred to Air Base 11, in Beja, having been equipped with the ground-attack aircraft Alpha Jet A. This aircraft's first flight was conducted on October 6, 1993, by of Major Lopes da Silva.

During the joint exercise COMAO (Composite Air Operations), on September 5, 2005, the 301 Squadron reached the 20,000 flight hours with its Alpha Jet fleet. Shortly after, on November 20, 2005, the "Jaguares" conducted their last operation flight with the Alpha Jet.

On November 25, 2005, the 301 Squadron was transferred to Air Base 5, in Monte Real, and equipped with the modernized F-16 MLU, being the first flight squadron of the Portuguese Air Force to operate exclusive this version of the fighter.

== Aircraft ==
- Fiat G-91 R4 (1978–1993)
- Dassault/Dornier Alpha Jet A (1993–2005)
- F-16 Fighting Falcon AM/BM (2005–present)

== Achievements ==
- Distinctive Services Gold Medal (Medalha de Ouro de Serviços Distintos) (April 19, 1988)
- Silver Tiger 1980, 1985 and 2011 trophy

== Deployments ==
- Operation Baltic Air Policing (November 1, 2007 – December 15, 2007)
  The 301 Squadron participated in the patrol of the skies of the Baltic states (Lithuania, Estonia and Latvia) with two F-16 AM along with four F-16 A block 15 of 201 Squadron.
- Icelandic Air Policing (August 7, 2012 – September 20, 2012)
  Provided air defense of Iceland's airspace along with fighters from 201 Squadron.

=== Exercises ===
- NATO Tiger Meet
  - Guest squadron (1978)
  - Host (1987)
  - Host (1996)
  - Host (2002)
  - Host (2020)
- "Dinamic Mix"
  - 1997, Italy
  - 1998, Turkey
  - 2000, Greece
- "Central Enterprise", Germany (1999)
- "Polygonne", Germany (1999)
- "Linked Seas 2000", Ovar (2000)
- "EOLO", Spain (2000)
- Real Thaw (2009–2021)

== See also ==
- List of F-16 Fighting Falcon operators
- 201 Squadron
