= Taktisches Luftwaffengeschwader 74 =

Coordinates: 48°42′N 11°51′E

74th Tactical Air Force Wing
- Taktisches Luftwaffengeschwader 74
- Active: 5 May 1961–present
- Country: West Germany (1961-1990); Germany (1990–present)
- Branch: German Air Force
- Role: Air Defence
- Part of: 1st Air Force Division (1. Luftwaffendivision)
- Garrison/HQ: Neuburg an der Donau Neuburg Air Base
- Patron: Werner Mölders (1973-2005)

Commanders
- Current commander: Col (Oberst)Gordon Schnitger

Aircraft flown
- Fighter: Formerly: F-86K Sabre, F-104G Starfighter, F-4F Phantom II; Present: Eurofighter Typhoon

Taktisches Luftwaffengeschwader 74 (74th Tactical Air Force Wing), formerly known as Jagdgeschwader 74 (JG 74) (74th Fighter Wing), is an aviation unit of the German Air Force, based on Neuburg Air Base in Bavaria since 1961. On 1 October 2013, the unit was renamed in the course of adaptations to the new structure of the German Air Force.

JG 74 provides air defence duties for southern Germany. The wing operates two squadrons of Eurofighter Typhoons, the Falken (Falcons) squadron and the Viva Zapata squadron.

== History ==
JG 74 was activated as the last West German fighter wing on 5 May 1961. It was equipped with the F-86K Sabre interceptor and first based at Leipheim in 1960 as JG 75. It moved to Neuburg Air Base a short time later after this base had been opened and was renamed JG 74. In the period from 1964/66 JG 74 received the F-104G Starfighter. The Starfighter proved to be a troublesome aircraft for the Luftwaffe, which lost 292 of 916 Starfighters, 116 pilots died. JG 74 also lost several of them until the wing converted to the F-4F Phantom II in 1974.

The F-4F was a downgraded F-4E which could not fire the medium range AIM-7 Sparrow air-to-air missile. The use was forbidden until Germany became fully sovereign in 1990. Since then the F-4Fs were upgraded to F-4F ICE standard in the 1990s and were finally equipped to use the AIM-120 AMRAAM missile. Due to the smoke generated by the F-4's General Electric J79 engines, the German pilots dubbed the F-4F the "Air Defence Diesel". The last of the F-4Fs was retired on 12 June 2008.

From 2006 to June 2008 JG 74 transitioned to the Eurofighter Typhoon.

== Mölders ==
Thirty-two years after the crash and death of the German World War II fighter ace Werner Mölders, JG 74 received the honorary name of "JG 74 Mölders" on 22 November 1973. However, the German parliament decided in 1998 that it is not proper to name organizations after people who were active in the Legion Condor. The German Military History Institute researched Mölders conduct and concluded that he concurred in his actions with the Nazi government, and never opposed any actions taken by the Nazis. Therefore, the name "Mölders" was dropped by JG 74 on 11 June 2005.

== Gallery ==
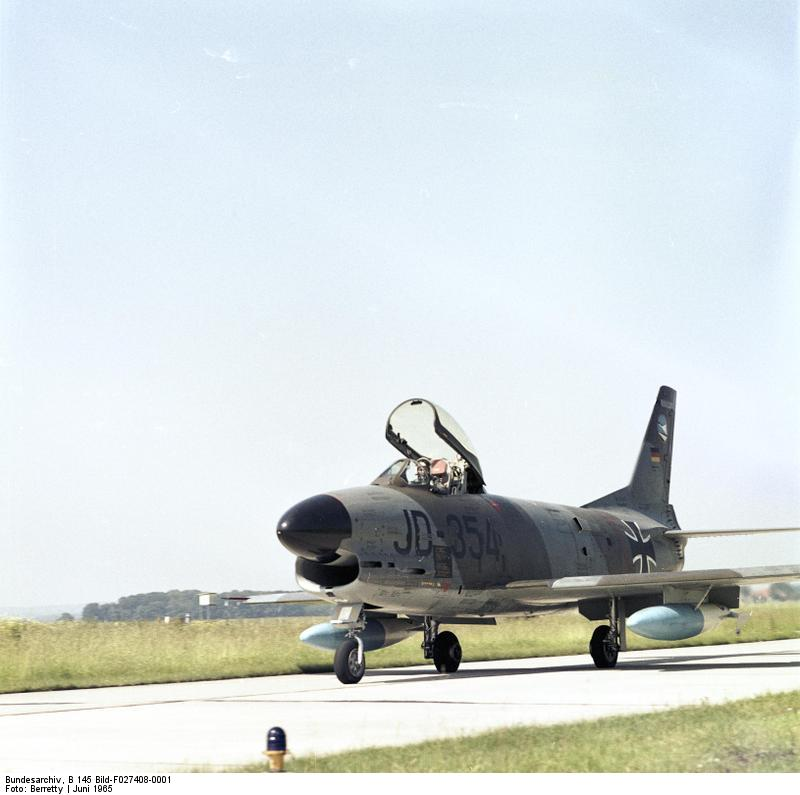
An F-86K Sabre of JG 74

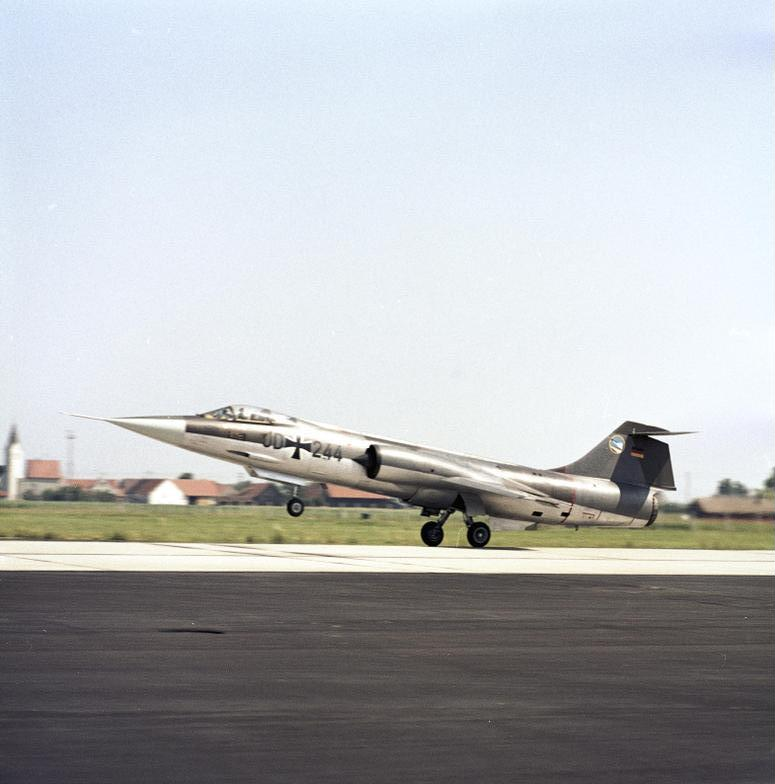
F-104G Starfighter

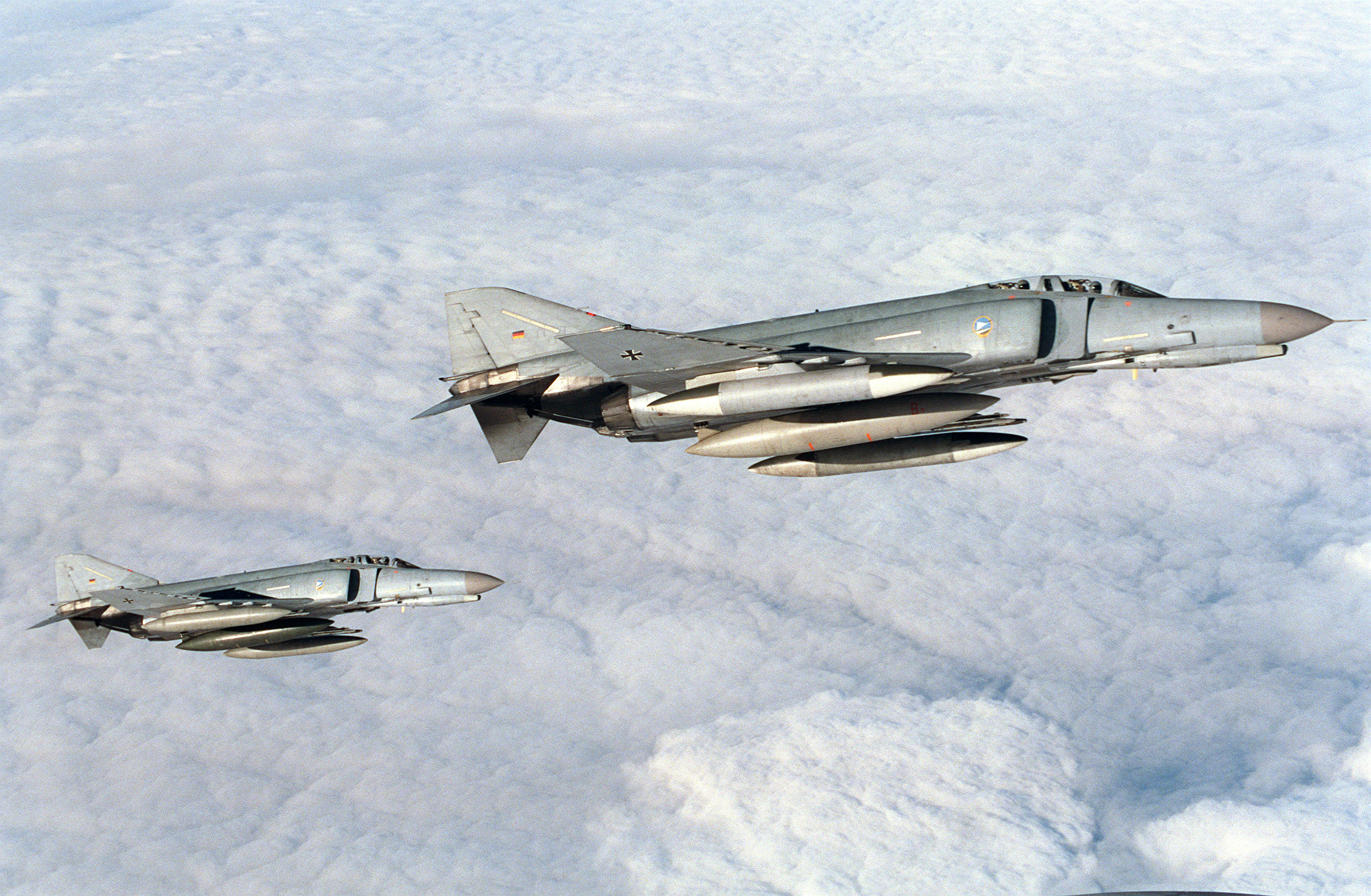
Two JG 74 F-4Fs in 1998

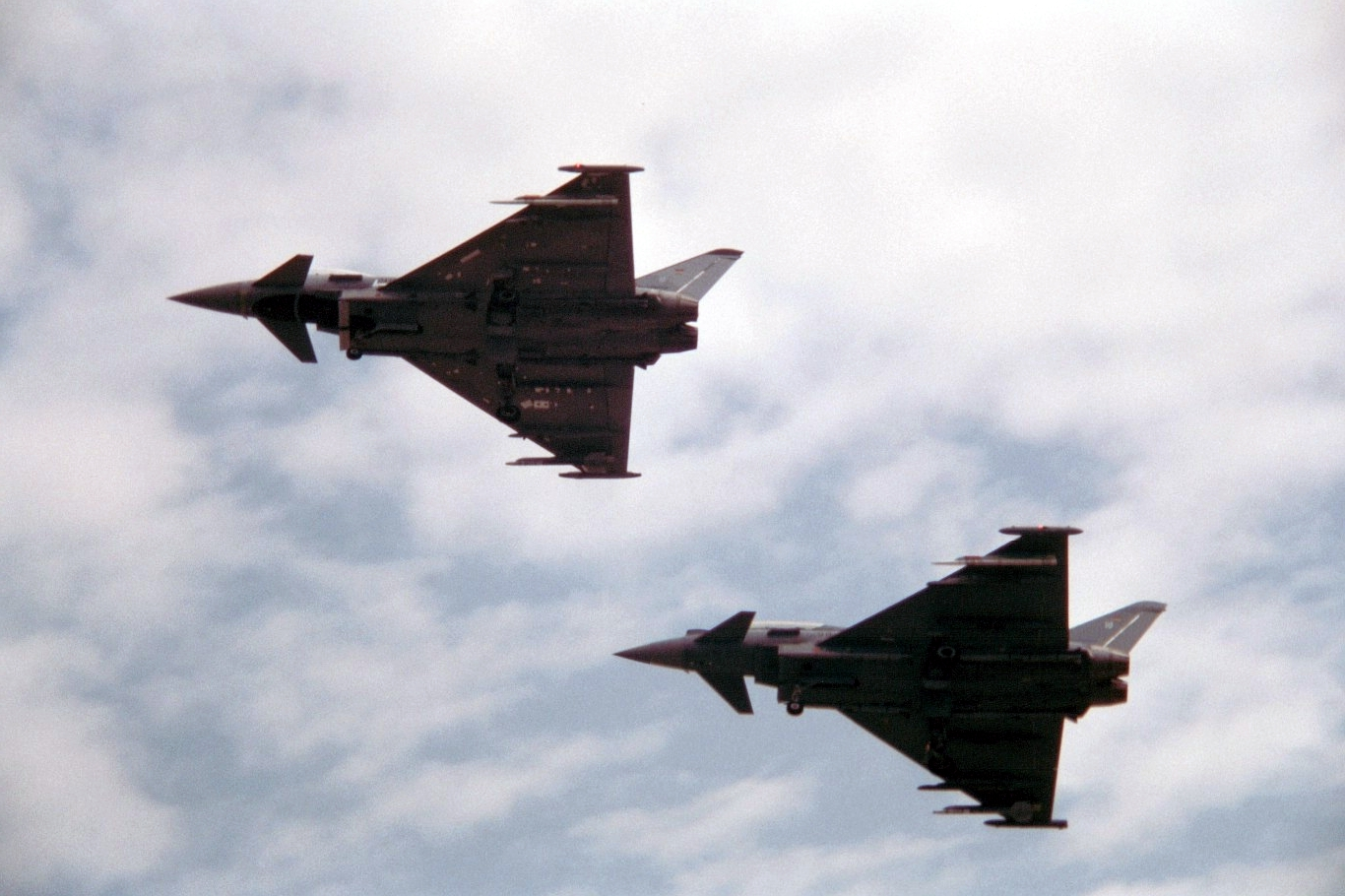
Two JG 74 Eurofighters

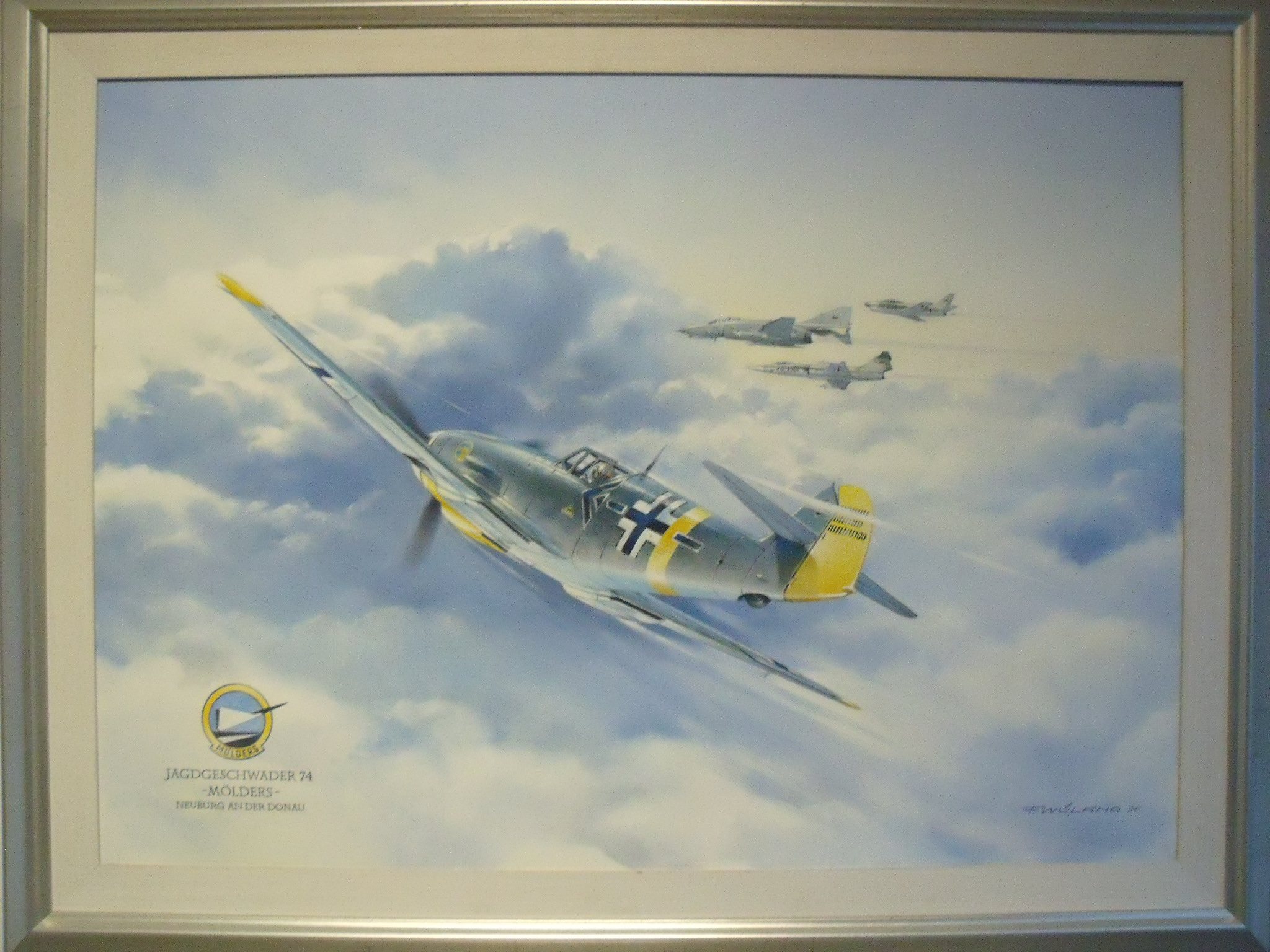
Painting with Jagdgeschwader 74 planes, and a Bf-109 with Mölder's wartime markings (minus the swastika)
