= Lisbon Luís de Camões Airport =

Future airport in Alcochete, Portugal

Luís de Camões Airport Aeroporto Luís de Camões
- IATA: none; ICAO: none

Summary
- Airport type: Public-private
- Owner: Government of Portugal
- Operator: ANA Aeroportos de Portugal (granted under concession to Vinci Airports until 2062)
- Serves: Lisbon metropolitan area
- Location: Samora Correia, Benavente and Canha, Montijo, Lisbon and Tagus Valley region, Portugal
- Opened: 2034; 8 years' time (projected)
- Elevation AMSL: 45 m / 148 ft
- Coordinates: 38°46′N 8°48′W

Map
- Location of airport in Portugal

Runways
Direction	Length		Surface
Direction	m	ft	Surface
18R/36L	4,000	13,123	Asphalt
18L/36R	4,000	13,123	Asphalt
- Data based on the 2010 EIA study

Luís de Camões Airport (Aeroporto Luís de Camões) is a planned international airport that will primarily serve Lisbon, the capital of Portugal. It will be located 40 km (25 mi) by road from Lisbon's downtown, on the current site of Field Firing Range of Alcochete, an area administratively part of the civil parishes of Samora Correia (in Benavente municipality) and Canha (in Montijo municipality).

== Overview ==
The new airport is projected to be completed in 2034, at which time the existing Lisbon Airport will be shut down. It is projected to cost up to €9 billion and will be funded from European Union funds, public-private partnerships, and airport tariffs. It will have the capability of meeting projected demand of 100 million passengers annually by 2050, an increase from current Lisbon air traffic of approximately 30 million passengers per year. The airport will have two runways with capacity for up to 95 movements per hour with the possibility of expanding to up to four runways.

The airport is to be named after 16th century poet Luís de Camões.

== History ==
After years of debate on a location for a new airport near Lisbon, including the possibility of building the Ota Airport, in January 2008 a location in the Field Firing Range of Alcochete was chosen since it is more accessible due to nearby infrastructure such as the Vasco da Gama Bridge. The environmental impact assessment study was completed in early 2010 and granted an approval permit by the Portuguese Environment Agency on 9 December 2010. By then, Alcochete Airport was planned to open in late 2017. However, shortly thereafter, forced by the 2010–2014 Portuguese financial crisis and the ensuing international bailout, the project was put on hold.

In 2017, Ryanair was a major proponent of converting the Montijo Air Base into a facility for low-cost carriers; the company said that the new airport could be operational with as little as €25 million.

In October 2019, the Portuguese Environment Agency gave approval for construction of Montijo Airport if it met certain conditions including sound insulation requirements and restrictions on flights between midnight and 6AM. This permit, enacted in January 2020, eventually expired in January 2024, after the agency rejected the renewal request submitted by ANA-Vinci, leading to ultimately unsuccessful legal objections from the airport operator. In its 2024 decision, the Environment Agency cited increasing environmental concerns following new studies done in the area, most notably a negative opinion by the Institute for Nature Conservation and Forests.

In March 2021, the National Authority of Civil Aviation of Portugal rejected the formal evaluation request for construction of Montijo Airport submitted by airport operator ANA Aeroportos de Portugal, citing disagreements with the nearby municipalities as well as environmental concerns. The government then evaluated changing the law or selecting another location for the airport.

In May 2024, the Portuguese government announced that the new airport will be built in Field Firing Range of Alcochete and will be ready in 2034. The decision followed the possibility of building the airport in Montijo, near to the Tagus Estuary Natural Reserve, a site favoured by Vinci Airports (to whom ANA was granted under concession in 2012) and opposed by environmental, aeronautic and other civil society groups, as well as by the Order of Engineers and the Order of Economists.
