= LTV A-7P Corsair II =

Portuguese attack aircraft

A-7P Corsair II
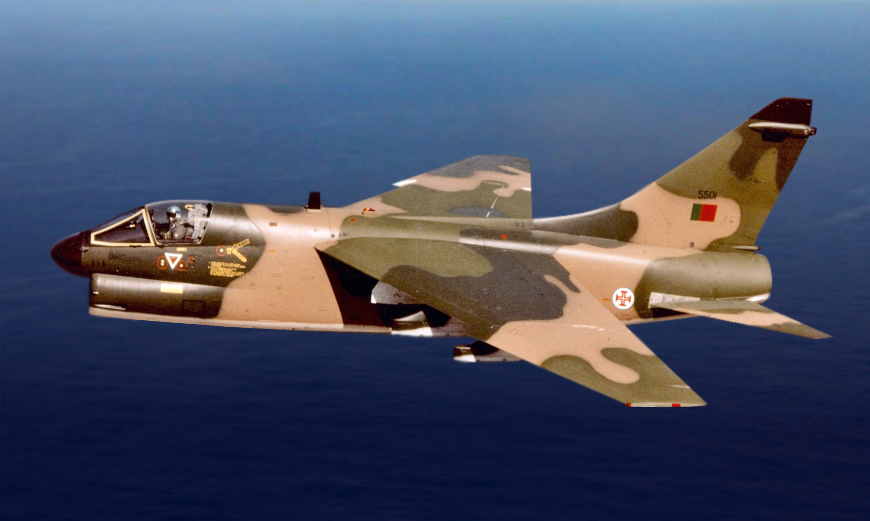
- Portuguese Air Force A-7P in flight

General information
- Type: Attack aircraft
- National origin: United States
- Manufacturer: Ling-Temco-Vought
- Status: Retired
- Primary user: Portuguese Air Force (historical)

History
- Retired: 1999
- Developed from: LTV A-7 Corsair II

The Portuguese Air Force (PoAF) operated 50 LTV A-7 Corsair II aircraft in the anti-ship, air interdiction and air defense roles between 1981 and 1999. The Portuguese government acquired the Corsair II to replace the PoAF's North American F-86 Sabre fighters, with two orders being placed for a total of 50 A-7Ps and TA-7Ps. As part of the program one TA-7C belonging to the United States Navy was also loaned to the PoAF.

During its 18 years of service in the PoAF the A-7 fleet suffered 14 accidents and suffered from numerous maintenance and logistic problems in its last years of service due to the lack of spare parts and financial problems. Nevertheless, the program was seen as a success due to the evolution that it allowed the Air Force in aircraft maintenance, with focus in modern computer and electronic systems, and in the qualification of technicians and the modernization of the Portuguese military aviation industry.

== Acquisition ==
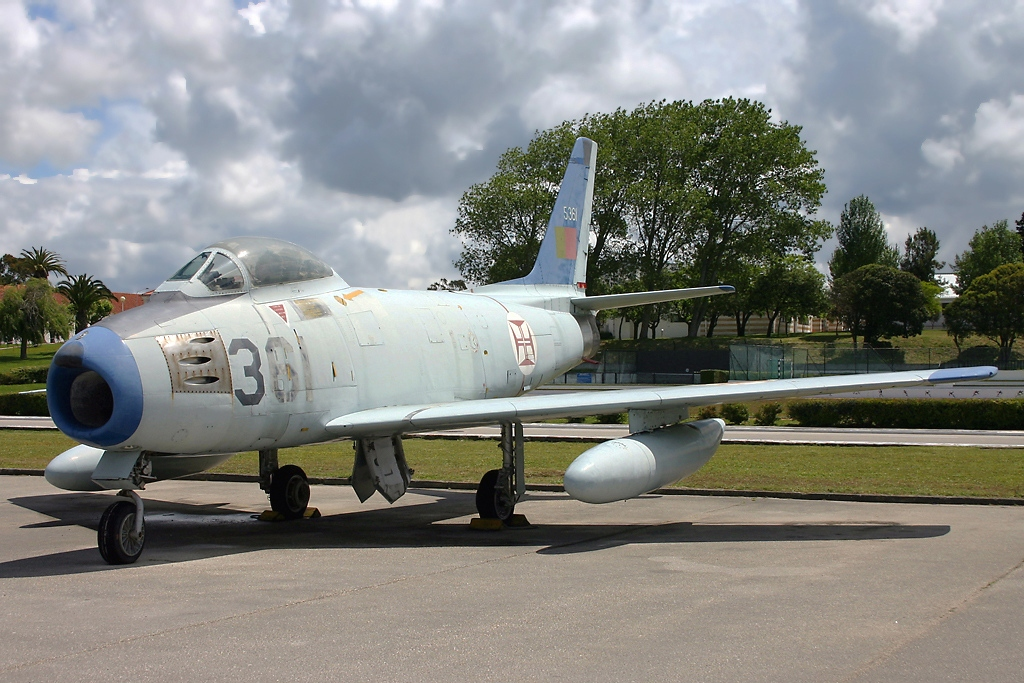
Portuguese F-86F Sabre which was replaced by the A-7 Corsair II in the air defense role

The acquisition of the A-7P Corsair II was the result of many attempts by Portugal to replace its F-86F Sabre in the air defense role and, to some extent, the Fiat G.91 in the ground attack role. The first attempts started in 1968, during the Ultramar War, due to the performance of the Portuguese fighters in Africa. After the end of the war, the Portuguese Air Force (PoAF) renewed its attempts in procuring new air combat aircraft because of the F-86 and G.91 being outdated compared to the aircraft fielded by its NATO allies and the countries of the Warsaw Pact.

During this process the PoAF evaluated the Dassault Mirage III, Dassault Mirage 5, Northrop F-5, McDonnell Douglas F-4 Phantom II, and the SAAB J-35 Draken before selecting the Corsair II in 1980.

=== Wartime attempts ===
During the Ultramar War the Portuguese Air Force operated the F-84 Thunderjet, F-86 Sabre, and Fiat G.91 without much resistance from the guerrilla forces until the appearance of the Strela 2, in Guinea, in the early 1970s threatened the Portuguese air superiority. However, it had also become clear in the late-1960s that Portugal lacked a modern fighter capable of carrying out strikes with heavy payloads deep inside enemy territory. The fighters in service also lacked a self-defense capability when operating without escorts and were not able to counter the Soviet-made fighter aircraft that could potentially be supplied by communist states to the rebels and operated from the neighboring countries of Portugal's oversea territories.

In 1968, a rearmament study by the Air Force perceived the need for a new fighter capable of reaching Mach 2 in horizontal flight and a rate of climb that allowed it to reach 40,000 ft in less than five minutes. The study also gave preference to twin-engine aircraft and specified the armament capacity and the capability to operate in hot environments, in addition to being capable of flying directly from mainland Portugal to Sal, Cape Verde. The preferred contenders at the time were the Dassault Mirage III, Dassault Mirage 5, Northrop F-5A, and McDonnell-Douglas F-4C Phantom II.

Nonetheless, it was only in 1971 that the Portuguese government gave priority to the procurement of new fighters and approved a new rearmament plan for the purchase of 64 fighters, 28 of which would be for the defense of mainland Portugal and 36 to be deployed overseas. This plan called for an initial order of 30 aircraft (27 single-seat and three twin-seat). At the time Portugal was under a United Nations arms embargo and the United States was against the Portuguese colonial war and Portugal's presence in Africa, having even previously put limitations on the use of Portuguese F-86F Sabre fighters in Africa. Meanwhile, France saw a Portuguese presence in Africa as coinciding with its own interests and had become, between 1964 and 1971, in the largest supplier of weapons to Portugal. As such, the Dassault Mirage was seen as the best option.

In 1969 the French government's foreign relations underwent a change with Charles de Gaulle leaving office and Georges Pompidou taking over as president. This change in policy included improving French relations with French speaking African countries, which resulted in defense accords with Senegal. Talks about the purchase of French fighters started in December 1971, but the French government was then worried that Portuguese Mirage fighters stationed in Africa would be in range of Guinea-Conakry and Senegal, and would result in protests against France by these countries. In 1972 France gave permission for the start of negotiations as long as conditions for the basing of the aircraft were agreed on before any acquisition took place. However, by then the Portuguese government was facing financial problems and the difference between Portugal's and France's strategy for Africa had also further slowed any talks.

In March 1973 the Portuguese minister of Defense, Horácio José de Sá Viana Rebelo, contacted the French government regarding the procurement of 50 to 100 Dassault Mirage F1 fighters, which were more expensive than either the Mirage III or Mirage 5. Later in November Viana Rebelo was replaced as minister of Defense by Silva Cunha, who was able to obtain additional funding for the rearmament of the armed forces. Following new funding, a new plan was made in February 1974 to acquire new aircraft for the Air Force, which included 32 Dassault Mirage 5 fighters along with 239 other airplanes and helicopters. This plan dismissed the option of acquiring the Mirage F1 because of its cost and the fact that it would take four years for the aircraft to be delivered.

The conflict in Guinea escalated in March 1973 and the PAIGC was able to shoot down five aircraft with newly acquired Strela 2 surface-to-air missile launchers. The commander of the PoAF's Cape Verde and Guinea Air Zone (Portuguese: Zona Aérea de Cabo Verde e Guiné, ZACVG) requested 12 of the planned Mirage 5 to replace the North American T-6G and Fiat G.91 then operated.

Later in August 1973 it was reported that the rebels were receiving pilot training in the Soviet Union with the objective of operating MiG fighters from Guinea-Conakry. Further reports mentioned the possible involvement of the Guinea Air Force, which had started receiving help from Cuban pilots and technicians to maintain its MiG-17F fleet that were mostly inoperable.

On February 20, 1974, the French minister of Defense, Robert Galley, wrote to the minister of Foreign Affairs, Michel Jobert, about Portugal's purchase of 26 to 28 Mirage III or Mirage 5 fighters, under the condition that the fighters were not to be based in Guinea or in Cape Verde. Nevertheless, Galley didn't see a problem with these fighters being stationed in Angola and Mozambique, especially since France had already sold Mirage fighters to South Africa.

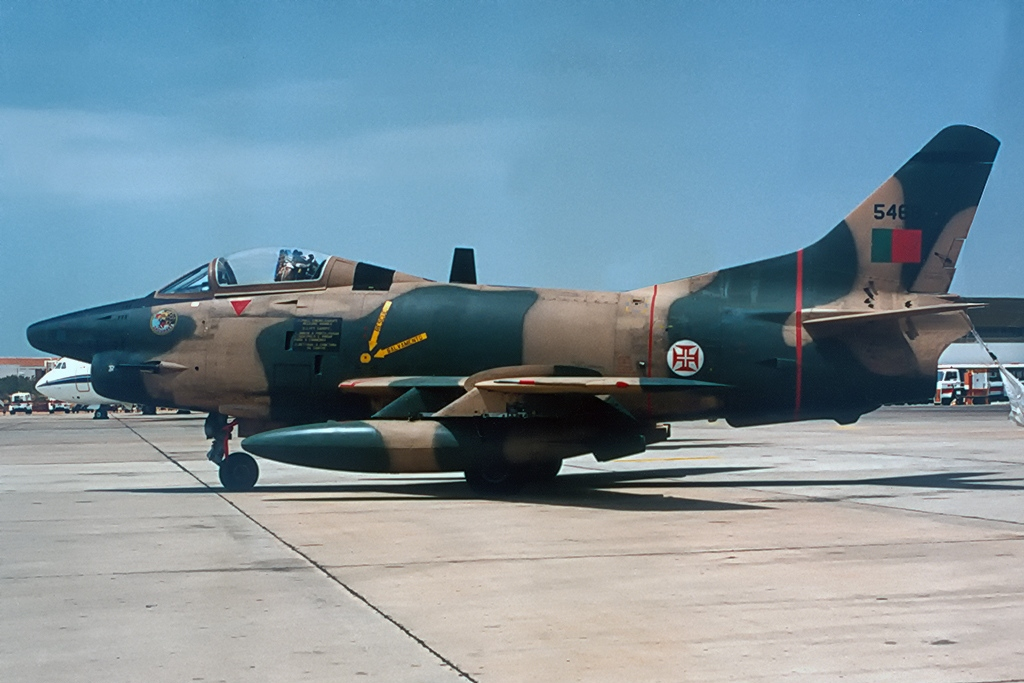
Portuguese Air Force Fiat G.91, which was also to be replaced by a new fighter

The African and Malagasy Affairs Directorate (French: Direction des Affaires Africaines et Malgaches, DAM) of the ministry of Foreign Affairs went further and was against allowing any future Portuguese Mirage aircraft being based in Angola and Mozambique since Congo, Tanzania, Zaire, or Zambia could be against it. Upon the stalemate between the two ministries, France's then-prime minister Pierre Messmer agreed with the minister of Defense to only impose basing restrictions to Cape Verde and Guinea.

On April 3, 1974, the International Affairs assistant director of the French Ministry of Defense, Philippe Esper, met in Lisbon with the Portuguese government to start negotiations and discuss the imposition of restrictions, delivery schedule, and pilot and ground crew training. The Portuguese government then decided on the purchase of a variant of the Mirage IIIE, to be designated Mirage IIIEPL, instead of the Mirage 5.

Later on April 24, 1974, the Portuguese minister of Foreign Affairs, Rui Patrício, met with the French ambassador Bernard Durand in Lisbon to further discuss the restrictions regarding the basing of any fighters supplied by France in Guinea, given the need to dissuade attacks by rebel aircraft operating from Guinea-Conakry. At this time the French prime minister had already given permission for the sale of 32 Mirage IIIE aircraft valued at 750 million francs while maintaining the restrictions that the Portuguese had not agreed with.

After the Carnation Revolution, on April 25, 1974, Portugal started its decolonization process and withdrew its military forces from its oversea territories. With this change in policy and strategy the acquisition of the Mirage III stopped being a priority and the new political regime did not continue the negotiation process.

=== Post-war aircraft acquisition ===
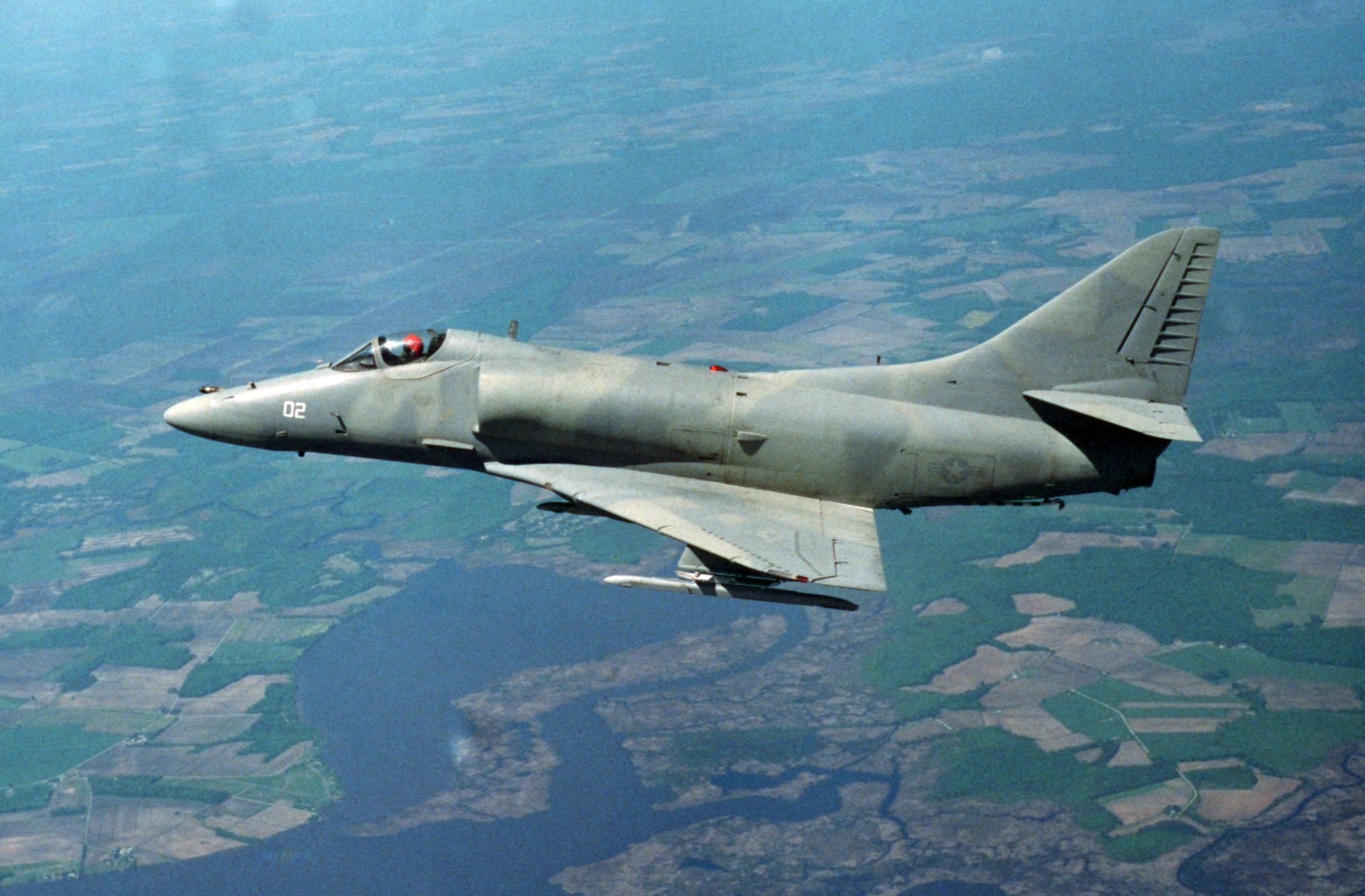
A U.S. Navy Douglas A-4F Skyhawk in flight in 1987

With the end of the conflict in Africa the Portuguese Armed Forces went through a reorganization and shifted their focus back from counter-insurgency to honoring Portugal's commitments to NATO and preparing for a possible conflict in Europe against the Warsaw Pact. The Portuguese Air Force's F-86F Sabre and G.91 fighters were considered to be outdated in both the air defense and ground attack roles to face Soviet forces in the European operations theater and only a few Sabre fighters were in service due to problems with the engines and lack of spare parts.

After the revolution Portugal faced financial problems and the new government didn't see the modernization of the armed forces as a priority, as such the Air Force counted on the support from the United States through the military assistance programs and the offsets and compensations for the use of the Lajes Air Base. In June 1974 the Air Force Chief of Staff, General Manuel Diogo Neto, informed the US Military Assistance Advisory Group (MAAG) in Lisbon of the interest in acquiring one F-5E Tiger II squadron and one F-4E Phantom II squadron, as well as the T-38A Talon to replace the T-33 Shooting Star, and the T-41 Mescalero to replace the DHC-1 Chipmunk.

During a meeting on July 30, 1974, at the Foreign Affairs Ministry regarding an agreement for the use of the Lajes Air Base, a revised request was presented, which only listed 16 F-5E Tiger IIs, 16 T-38As, 20 T-41As and 12 AH-1Q Cobras for Portuguese service at an estimated value of 165 million dollars.

In addition to the offsets from the use of Lajes, Portugal relied on the offsets of an agreement with the German Air Force for the use of Beja Air Base to acquire former German Fiat G.91R aircraft.

The United States delegation to NATO was worried with Portugal's capability in contributing to NATO operations and felt that the intention to purchase either the F-4E Phantom II or the F-5E Tiger II to replace the F-86F Sabre was inappropriate given that it felt that the A-7D Corsair II or the A-4M Skyhawk provided a better platform for the Portuguese role in an eventual conflict with the Warsaw Pact, which was to mainly protect the Atlantic Ocean resupply routes from the United States to Europe. Additionally, in case of an escalation of the Cold War, the air defense of Portugal and of the Iberian Peninsula was assigned to the Spanish Air Force and the United States Air Force's 401st Tactical Fighter Wing based at Torrejon Air Base, Spain. In this context, both the Skyhawk and Corsair II were better suited for the naval attack role.

By 1976 the Northrop F-5E Tiger II had become the sole preferred aircraft by the military command, which believed that this aircraft could be supplied by The Pentagon at a lower cost through the Military Assistance Program (MAP) and the Foreign Military Sales (FMS). To this end, Portugal leased Northrop T-38A Talon jet trainers, as part of the "Peace Talon" program, to establish and provide supersonic-capable lead-in fighter training and to eventually provide operational conversion.

Later in March, 1976, a camouflage scheme for the F-5 was published in the Diário da República. Nonetheless, at the time the PoAF had already started analyzing the acquisition of the A-7 Corsair II as an alternative to the F-5, per the suggestion of the United States.

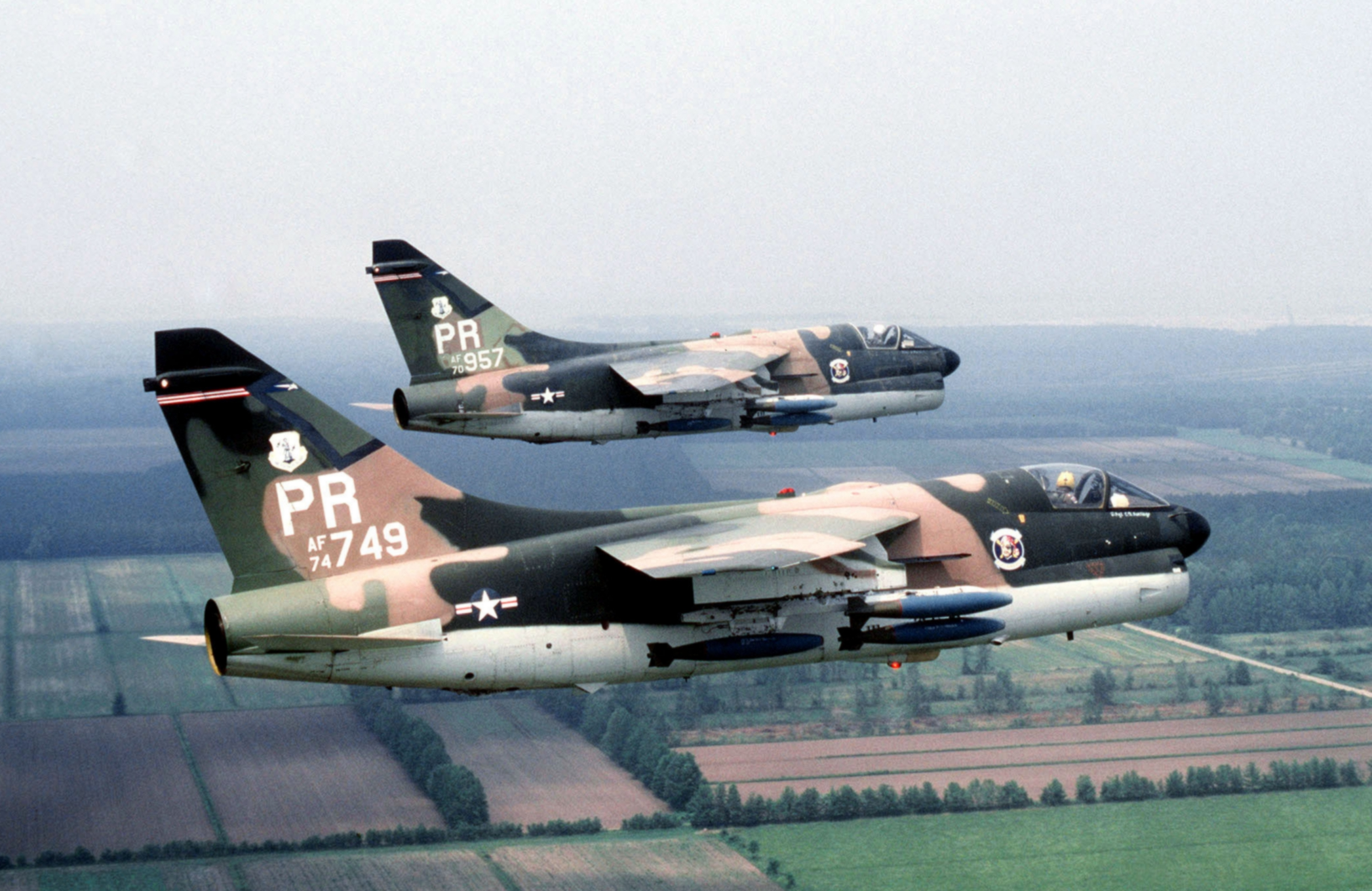
Two U.S. Air Force A-7D Corsair II aircraft armed with Mark 82 227 kg practice bombs during exercise "Solid Shield 78"

On November 15, 1979, a meeting took place with a US delegation and the Portuguese government and military command to discuss the acquisition of the new fighters. A first proposal was for the purchase of 20 F-5 Tiger II to be delivered between May and October 1981, at a cost of 120 million dollars; additional spare parts were not included. Since the agreement for the use of the Lajes Air Base by the United States was only valued at 72 million dollars, Portugal would have been required to take out a 48 million dollar loan through the FMS, which would also dry up funds to acquire other types of aircraft and would require the additional payment of loan interest rates. Another proposal valued at 79 million dollars was for 12 F-5 fighters to be delivered between May and August 1981. This proposal would still have required a loan of 7 million dollars through the FMS and would not even have allowed for the formation of a complete squadron. The final proposal was for the acquisition of 30 A-7A Corsair II for 49 million dollars, which would be paid completely with the money from the Lajes agreement and that would have still have left funds for the modernization of the aircraft.

In addition to the most financial viable option, and while the A-7 lacked the interception and air superiority capabilities initially required for the F-86 replacement, it was seen that the aircraft would still provide a technological leap and an improvement in human resources qualification to the Air Force. Furthermore, the selection of the A-7 permitted more cost reductions by allowing the Air Force to move from two distinct aircraft types, one dedicated to air defense and the other to ground attack, to a single aircraft.

The A-7 Corsair II was officially selected and on May 5, 1980, the V-519 contract was signed for twenty aircraft, in which the program costs were shared by Portugal and the United States as part of both the Military Assistance Program and the agreement between the two countries for the use of the Lajes Air Base. Later in May 1983, Portugal ordered an additional thirty aircraft.

Even with the A-7 taking precedence, the PoAF continued interested in acquiring the F-5 for the air defense role and as a proper replacement for the F-86F Sabre. As such, a delegation was sent to Norway in July 1979 to evaluate F-5A/B aircraft of the Royal Norwegian Air Force (RNoAF). However, with the selection of the A-7, it was only in 1982 that new talks took place, with the RNoAF offering the sale of 11 F-5A that would require additional repairs due to cracks found in the airframe. While these fighters were offered at a low price, Portugal would have had to pay for the repairs. Furthermore, the PoAF was particularly interested in twin-seat F-5 fighters, but the RNoAF did not plan on retiring any of its F-5B aircraft. In November 1984, the United States offered four F-5A with spare engines to Portugal, but the latter declined the offer since the aircraft had logged over 3,000 flight hours. In the same year the RNoAF made a new offer of 15 to 20 F-5A/B, but the PoAF declined; since most of the aircraft would have required repairs and the airframes had few flight hours left.

Unable to purchase the F-5 the PoAF studied the purchase of the SAAB J-35 Draken and of second-hand French Mirage IIIs, but without any success. Without a dedicated air-to-air combat fighter, the A-7P permanently took over the air defense role until the entry in Portuguese service of the F-16 Fighting Falcon in 1994.

== Vought A-7P/TA-7P ==
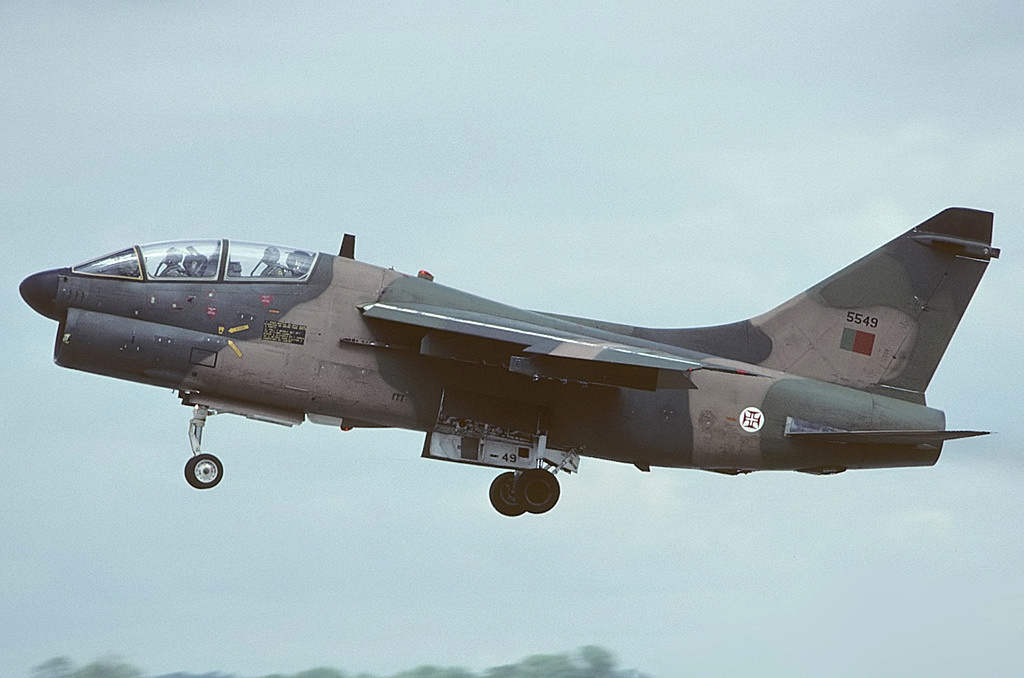
Portuguese TA-7P from 304 Squadron in 1991

The A-7P version acquired by Portugal were reconstructed and converted A-7A airframes powered by the Pratt & Whitney TF30-P-408 engine and equipped with A-7E/A-7D avionics. The initial 20 airframes for this conversion were chosen from 28 former-United States Navy airframes stored at AMARC, with the remaining 8 airframes being used for spare parts.

Six TA-7P later bought were also former A-7A airframes converted to tandem, twin-seat aircraft for training and operational pilot conversion that had the same capabilities as the A-7P with the exception of the guns, which were replaced by an oxygen system.

The airframes from both orders that were selected from AMARC already had between 2,331 and 4,523 flight hours before their conversion.

The avionics of the P version included the AN/ASN-91B armament control and navigation system, which consisted primarily of the Navigation/Weapon Delivery Computer (NWDC), air data computer (ADC), Flight Data Computer (FDC), AN/AVQ head-up display (HUD), ASCU/JBOX armament pylon station control unit, projected map display system (PMDS), and was equipped with the AN/ASN-90 inertial navigation system, AN/ASN-190 navigation Doppler radar, and the AN/APQ-126 terrain-following radar. This version was equipped with two Colt Mk 12 cannon that originally were used by the USN's A-7A and was capable of using newer missiles and bombs due to its modern avionics and sensors. All aircraft retained their in-flight refueling systems, making the A-7 the first aircraft operated by the PoAF with this capability.

These armament included the AIM-9 Sidewinder missile (P version) and in its last years of service the L version, BAP 100, M117, Mk 20, Mk 82, Mk 83, Mk 84, BL755 bombs, Folding-Fin Aerial Rocket, CRV-7 rockets, AGM-65 Maverick (B and G versions).

Between 1982 and 1989 the A-7 fleet was modernized with a hydraulic system upgrade, AN/ALR-46 radar warning receiver installation, IFF system implementation, and the installation of an Engine Condition Monitoring (ECM) system. In 1990 the HUD was further upgraded and received the CTVRDS recording system, the AN/ALR-46 was replaced by the SPS-1000 system, AN/ALE-40 Chaff and Flare dispenser system, and received the Improved Night Lights update and TA-7P were installed with Automatic Maneuvering Flaps (AMF).

In 1991, the PoAF bought AN/ALQ-131 electronic countermeasure pods to equip the A-7P. Later in 1995 the fire control and navigation computer (OFP-2) received a major update.

== Operational service ==
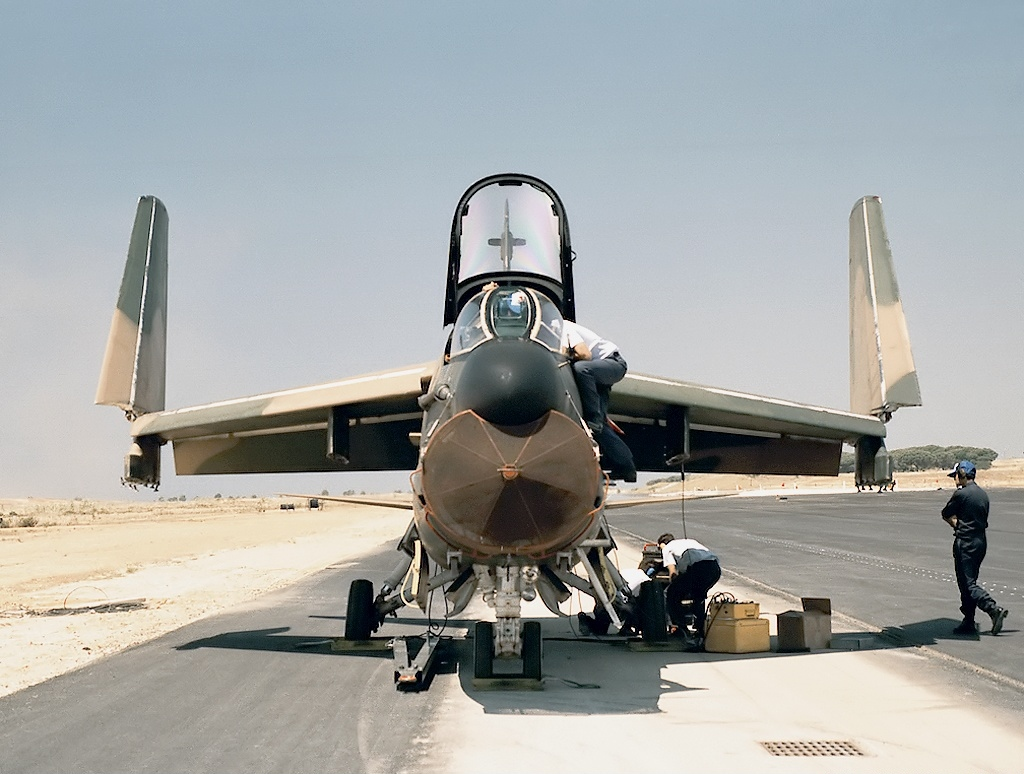
Portuguese A-7P undergoing repairs after an emergency landing

The Portuguese Air Force operated the A-7 primarily in the tactical air support for maritime operations and air interdiction roles, with air defense and counter air operations as a secondary role. These aircraft were operated by 302 Squadron, replacing the F-86F Sabre, and 304 Squadron, later created to operate the A-7, and served alongside the Fiat G.91 until this aircraft's retirement in 1993.

While these aircraft did not see any combat it was an important part of Portugal's commitment to NATO during the Cold War with both its operating squadrons being under the command of the Supreme Allied Commander Atlantic.

During their service the loss of several aircraft in accidents allied to lack of spare parts and logistics problems led to severe maintenance problems in the fleet and several aircraft were cannibalized for spare parts to service other fighters. This resulted in the available fighters no longer being assigned and dedicated to one specific squadron but shared and assigned to a squadron as needed.

These maintenance difficulties and financial problems resulted in the reduction of the squadron's flight hours, with the fleet only flying two hours in May 1988 and another 16 hours in August 1995, having the fleet been completely grounded in September of that year.

=== Introduction into service ===
The initial team of Portuguese pilot instructors (Portuguese: núcleo inicial de pilotos) underwent theoretical instruction and flight qualification training at Vought's facilities in Dallas, Texas, from October 12 to December 23, 1981. A cheaper alternative to train these first Portuguese A-7 pilots with the Air National Guard's A-7D at Tucson Air National Guard Base was also studied but the idea was discarded because of the differences between the A-7D and the A-7P versions.

Official delivery of the A-7P took place on August 18, 1981, at Andrews Air Force Base, where the Portuguese ambassador announced the intention to order a second squadron. The first part of the delivery of the aircraft to mainland Portugal, nicknamed Operation Peregrine Falcon (Portuguese: Operação Falcão Peregrino), started on December 21, 1981, with the first nine A-7P piloted by Vought and PoAF pilots taking off from Dallas and being supported by one PoAF C-130 Hercules, from 501 Squadron. These aircraft arrived on December 24, 1981, at Monte Real Air Base and the reception ceremony taking place on January 8, 1982. The remaining 11 aircraft were flown from Dallas by contracted civilian pilots and arrived in Portugal between February and September 29, 1982. These aircraft equipped 302 Squadron.

Additionally, one TA-7C (s/n 154404; c/n B-044) was temporarily provided by the United States Navy to Portugal in April 1982 to support the operational conversion of fighter pilots. This aircraft, a A-7B-1-CV Corsair II converted to TA-7C tandem twin-seat trainer, was nicknamed "White Dove" (Portuguese: Pomba Branca) due to the original USN white painting that was kept and its maintenance was provided by Vought technicians. It was later returned to the USN in June 1985.

In 1983 a second order was placed for an additional 24 A-7P and six TA-7P with deliveries taking place between October 8, 1984 and April 30, 1986, with one A-7P being lost prior to its delivery. These additional A-7P were to equip the 304 Squadron and the TA-7P were to be divided between the two squadrons.

=== Maintenance ===
As part of the acquisition program the Portuguese Air Force received equipment and its technicians were instructed in the first two echelons of maintenance. The first echelon performed by the squadron mechanics was responsible for service of the aircraft and their equipment, preflight and daily inspections, light repairs, anti-corrosive treatments, parts replacement, and refueling, while the second echelon was carried out at dedicated facilities at Monte Real Air Base (BA5) and was responsible for the periodic preventive inspections and the periodic servicing for the systems, engines and other aircraft equipment.

The third echelon responsible for Standard Depot Level Maintenance (SDLM) such as advanced periodic inspections and repairs to the airframe, avionics, electric systems, hydraulic components and engines was performed at the workshops at Indústria Aeronáutica de Portugal S.A. (OGMA), then part of the Air Force. Later, after the separation of OGMA from the Air Force and its creation as a company, some of the third echelon maintenance started being performed at BA5.

=== Accidents ===
The PoAF's Corsairs suffered several air crashes and accidents with the first taking place on May 9, 1984, in the United States. This first A-7P (PoAF s/n 15540; BuAer s/n 154346) was lost and destroyed prior to its delivery while undergoing flight testing due to a bird strike incident, resulting in the death of the pilot. In 1985 and 1986 three separate accidents resulted in the loss of five aircraft, with the more serious accident on May 26 during a ground attack training mission at Field Firing Range of Alcochete resulting in the death of one pilot.

The following accidents between March 27, 1987, and July 25, 1995, resulted in the further loss of nine aircraft and five deaths. Most losses occurred in Portugal with some accidents occurring in Greece, Spain, and the Netherlands during squadron exchanges and international exercises. The origin of these accidents were at least four bird strikes, one engine failure and one aircraft sliding off the runway during a landing.

PoAF A-7 fleet accidents
Date	PoAF s/n	BuAer s/n	Location	Cause	Notes
May 9, 1984	15540	154346	Dallas, Texas	Bird strike	Pilot killed and total aircraft loss
February 7, 1985	15518	153237	Coast off Marinha Grande, Portugal		Aircraft crashed into the sea
July 1, 1985	15501	154352	Belgium	Air collision	In flight to Liège Air Base for a squadron exchange
July 1, 1985	15505	153190	Belgium	Air collision	In flight to Liège Air Base for a squadron exchange
May 26, 1986	15535	153240	Field Firing Range of Alcochete	Air collision	One pilot killed and both aircraft destroyed
May 26, 1986	15543	154355	Field Firing Range of Alcochete	Air collision	One pilot killed and both aircraft destroyed
March 27, 1987	15541	154349	Boticas, Portugal	Ground collision	Pilot killed
November 24, 1987	15530	153151	Greece	Mechanical failure and on board fire	In flight to Souda Air Base for a squadron exchange
March 9, 1988	15516	153227	North of Baleal Island, Portugal	Bird strike	Pilot ejected safely over the sea
September 13, 1989	15520	153261	Monte Real Air Base, Portugal	Engine failure due to a problem with transfer of fuel	Pilot ejected safely
December 4, 1989	15510	153152	Vila Viçosa, Portugal	Ground collision	Pilot killed
April 29, 1992	15523	153159	Montijo Air Base, Portugal	Ground collision during final approach	Pilot killed, aircraft destroyed
September 22, 1992	15525	153171	Hemmelte, Germany	Engine failure	Pilot ejected safely, aircraft lost
March 15, 1994	15542	154351	Monte Real Air Base, Portugal	Aircraft slid off the runway during landing	Pilot uninjured, aircraft lost
May 13, 1994	15548	153249	Roses, Girona, Spain	Ground collision	TA-7P destroyed resulting in the death of the pilot and one mechanic flying in the backseat. During a "Dynamic Impact 94" attack training mission
July 25, 1995	15533	153173	Beja, Portugal	Engine failure	Pilot ejected safely, aircraft destroyed

== Retirement ==
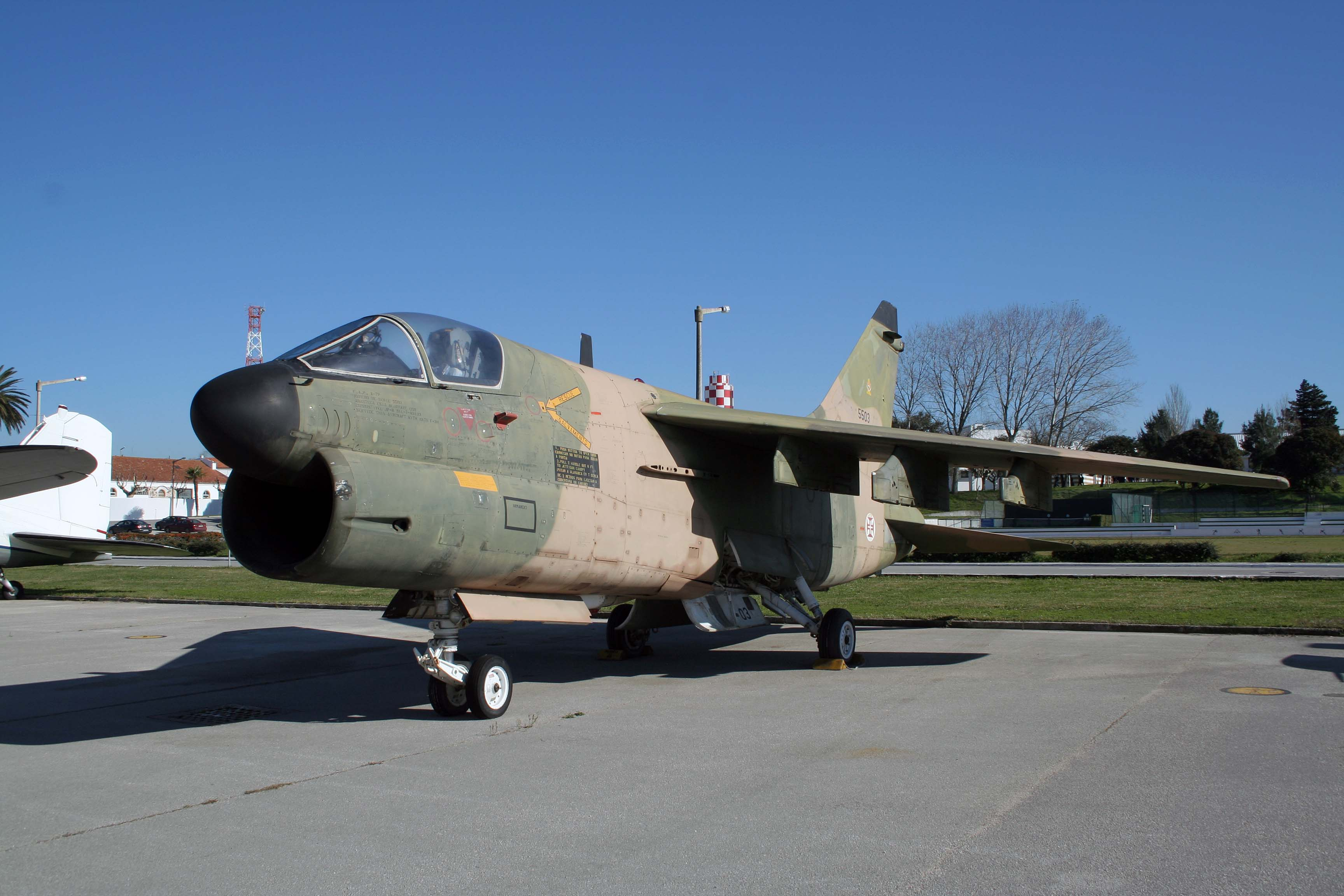
A PoAF A-7P Corsair II (s/n 15503) preserved at the Museu do Ar at Sintra Air Base, Portugal

The loss of a number of aircraft to accidents and problems with obtaining spare parts led Portugal in the late 1980s to begin the process of replacing the A-7 fleet, and in early 1990 a decision was made to acquire the General Dynamics F-16 Fighting Falcon.

On July 8, 1994, the first F-16 arrived in Portugal and in May 1996 the first A-7 squadron, 302 Squadron was deactivated and all personnel and A-7 aircraft were transferred to 304 Squadron. On July 9, 1999, 304 Sqn. was disbanded and the Portuguese Air Force A-7 fleet was finally retired from service, having performed a total of 63,600 flight hours.

The retired airframes belonging to the PoAF were then transferred to the General Storage Complex of the Air Force (Portuguese: Depósito Geral de Material da Força Aérea, DGMFA) in Alverca. In the mid-2000s most of these airframes were sold as scrap metal and several were stored at Ota, Monte Real and Beja Air Base installations, with one example (PoAF s/n 15502, BueAer s/n 153200) being transferred to the Polish Aviation Museum in Kraków and at least two aircraft being restored and displayed at the Air Force's museum, three aircraft have been preserved as gate guardians.

== See also ==
- List of LTV A-7 Corsair II operators
- Exercise Reforger
