= Lisbon Airport =

International airport in Portugal

Humberto Delgado Airport Aeroporto Humberto Delgado

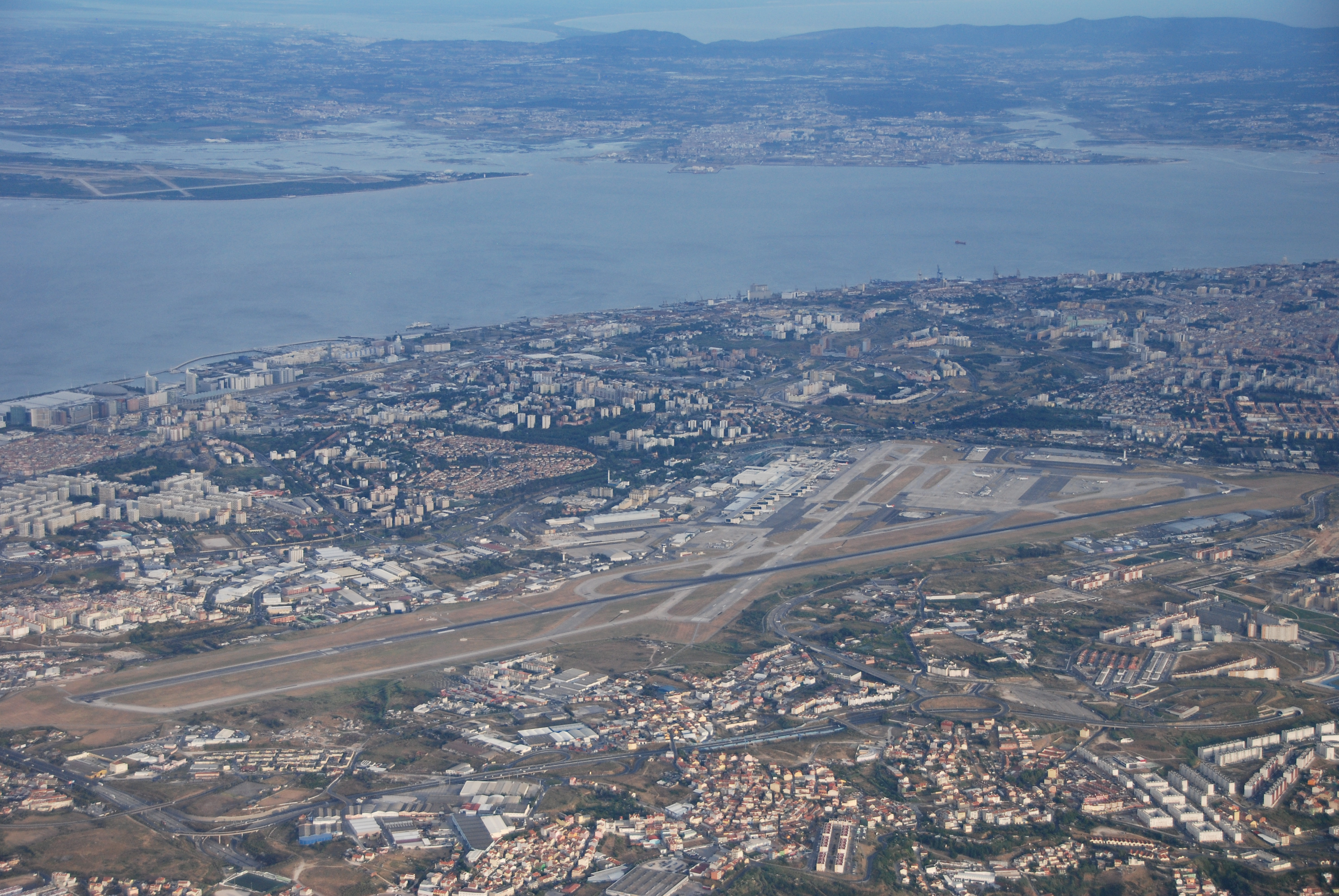
- IATA: LIS; ICAO: LPPT; WMO: 08579

Summary
- Airport type: Public / Military
- Owner: Government of Portugal
- Operator: ANA Aeroportos de Portugal (granted under concession to Vinci Airports from 2012 to 2062)
- Serves: Lisbon metropolitan area
- Location: Olivais, Lisbon, Portugal
- Opened: 15 October 1942; 84 years ago
- Hub for: TAP Air Portugal
- Focus city for: Azores Airlines
- Operating base for: easyJet; Ryanair
- Elevation AMSL: 114 m (374 ft)
- Coordinates: 38°46′27″N 009°08′03″W
- Website: www.lisbonairport.pt

Map
- Location within Lisbon LIS/LPPT (Portugal) LIS/LPPT (Europe)

Runways
Direction	Length		Surface
Direction	m	ft	Surface
02/20	3,705	12,156	Asphalt
~~17/35~~	~~2,319~~	~~7,608~~	~~Asphalt~~ (Closed)

Statistics (2025)
- Passengers: 36,126,000
- Passengers change 2024–25: ▲2.9%
- Aircraft Movements: 226,990
- Movements change 2024–25: ▲0.8%
- Sources: ANAC, Vinci, ANA Aeroportos de Portugal Publication

Humberto Delgado Airport (IATA: LIS, ICAO: LPPT) — informally Lisbon Airport and previously Portela Airport — is an international airport located seven kilometres (four nautical miles) northeast of the historical city centre of Lisbon, the capital of Portugal. With more than 36 million passengers per year, it is the 13th-largest airport in Europe in terms of passenger volume. It also carries approximately 200,000 tonnes of cargo per year.

The airport is the main hub of Portugal's flag carrier TAP Air Portugal, including its subsidiary TAP Express, and is a hub for low-cost carriers Ryanair and easyJet. It is a focus city for Azores Airlines, euroAtlantic Airways, Hi Fly, and White Airways. It is a major hub for flights to and from South America, notably Brazil, and Africa. The airport is run by the national airport operator ANA Aeroportos de Portugal, which in 2012 was granted under a 50-year-concession contract to the French group Vinci Airports, whose Portuguese branch is headed by José Luís Arnaut.

The airport is expected to be shut down after the Lisbon Luís de Camões Airport is fully operational, scheduled for 2034. In the meantime, it remains as one of the most congested airports in Europe and one of the only major airports to have an approach path directly over the city, which leads to noise pollution. Over 414,000 people live within a 5 km (3.1 mi) radius of the airport, the highest number among major airports in Europe. There is an increased risk for hypertension, diabetes, and dementia among nearby residents due to exposure to ultrafine particles left suspended in the air by planes. It has consistently ranked dismally in customer satisfaction, with AirHelp polling it sixth from the last amongst 239 airports in 2024. Planning of the construction of a new airport elsewhere started in the mid-1960s, when it was recognised Portela had virtually impossible prospects of expansion. Subsequently, relocation plans have been postponed or suspended for a myriad of reasons. There are ongoing debates regarding staffing for border and security scrutiny, the optimization of slot attributions, and the best use of the current infrastructure.

== History ==
=== Early years ===
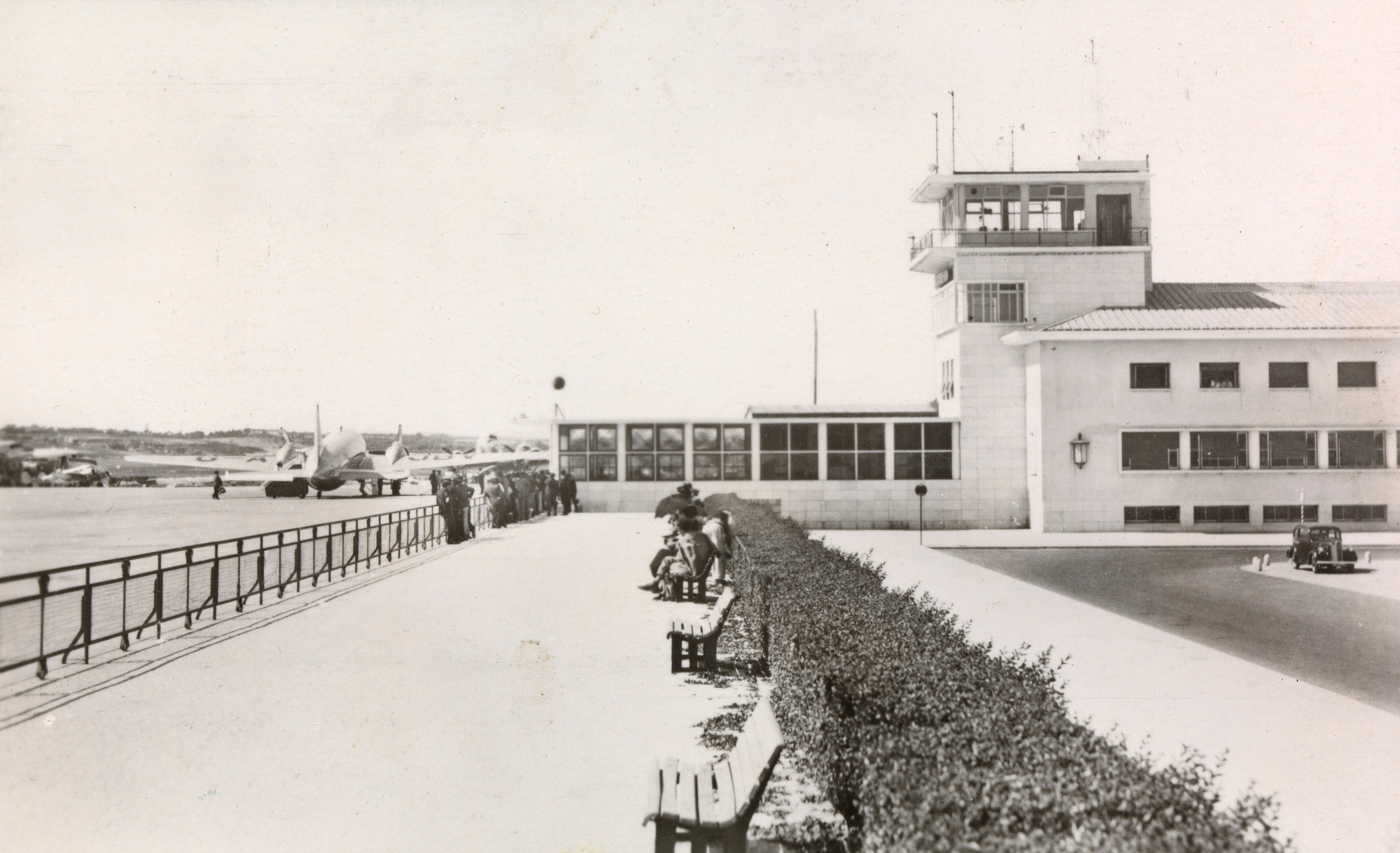
Lisbon Airport in 1951

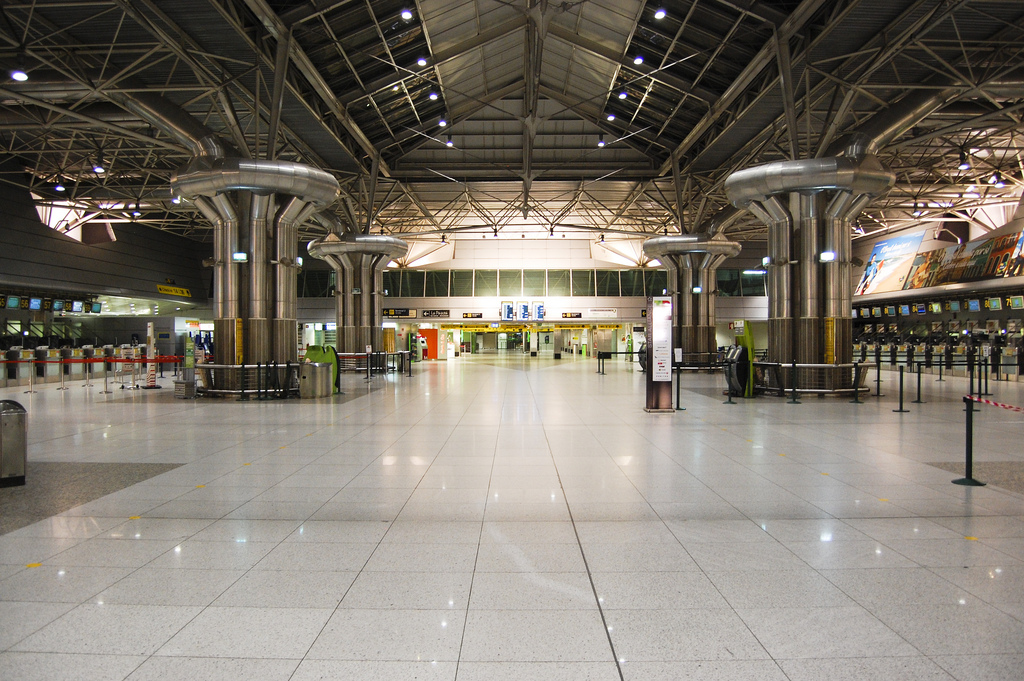
Terminal 1 check-in hall

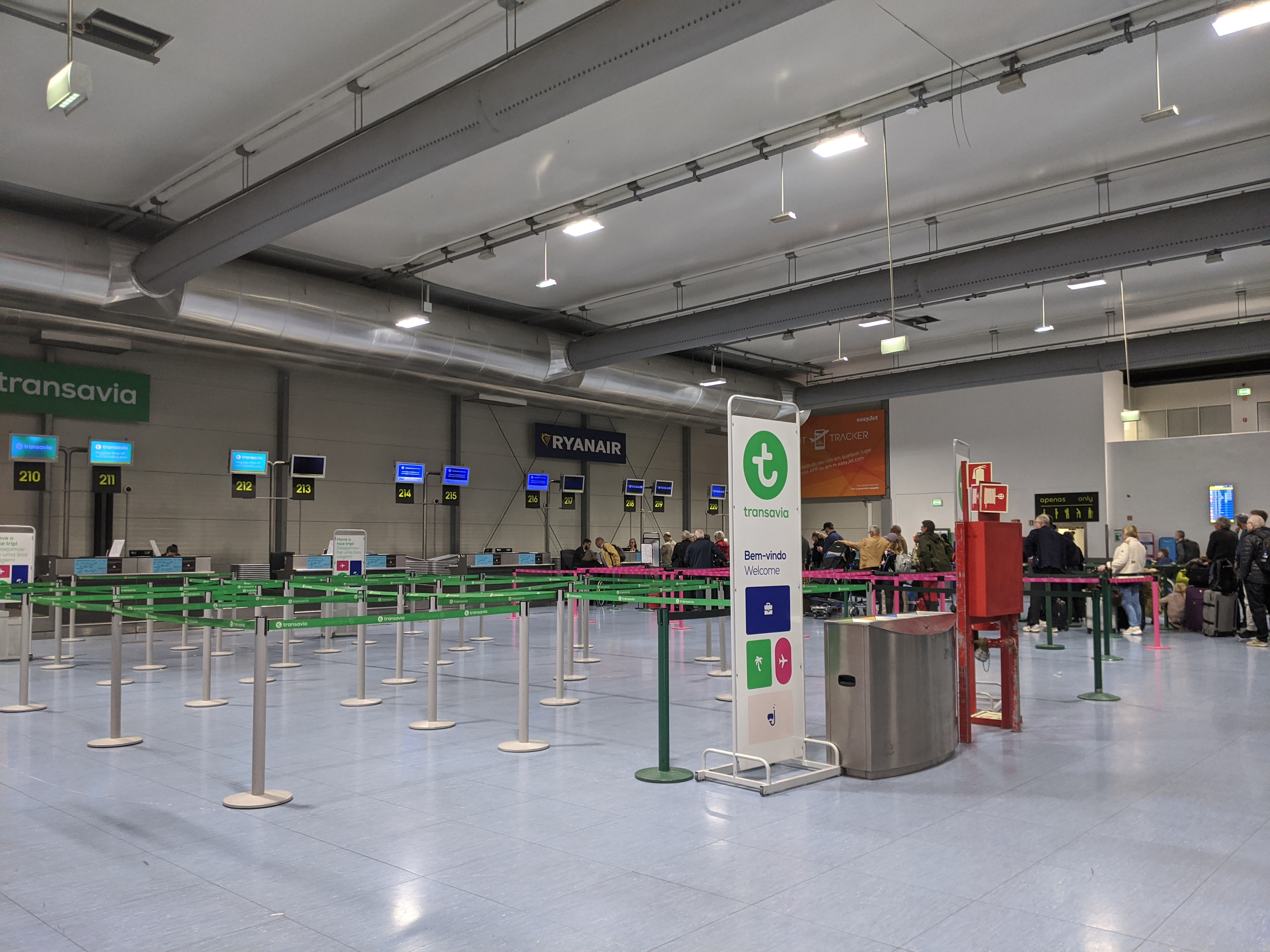
Terminal 2 check-in area

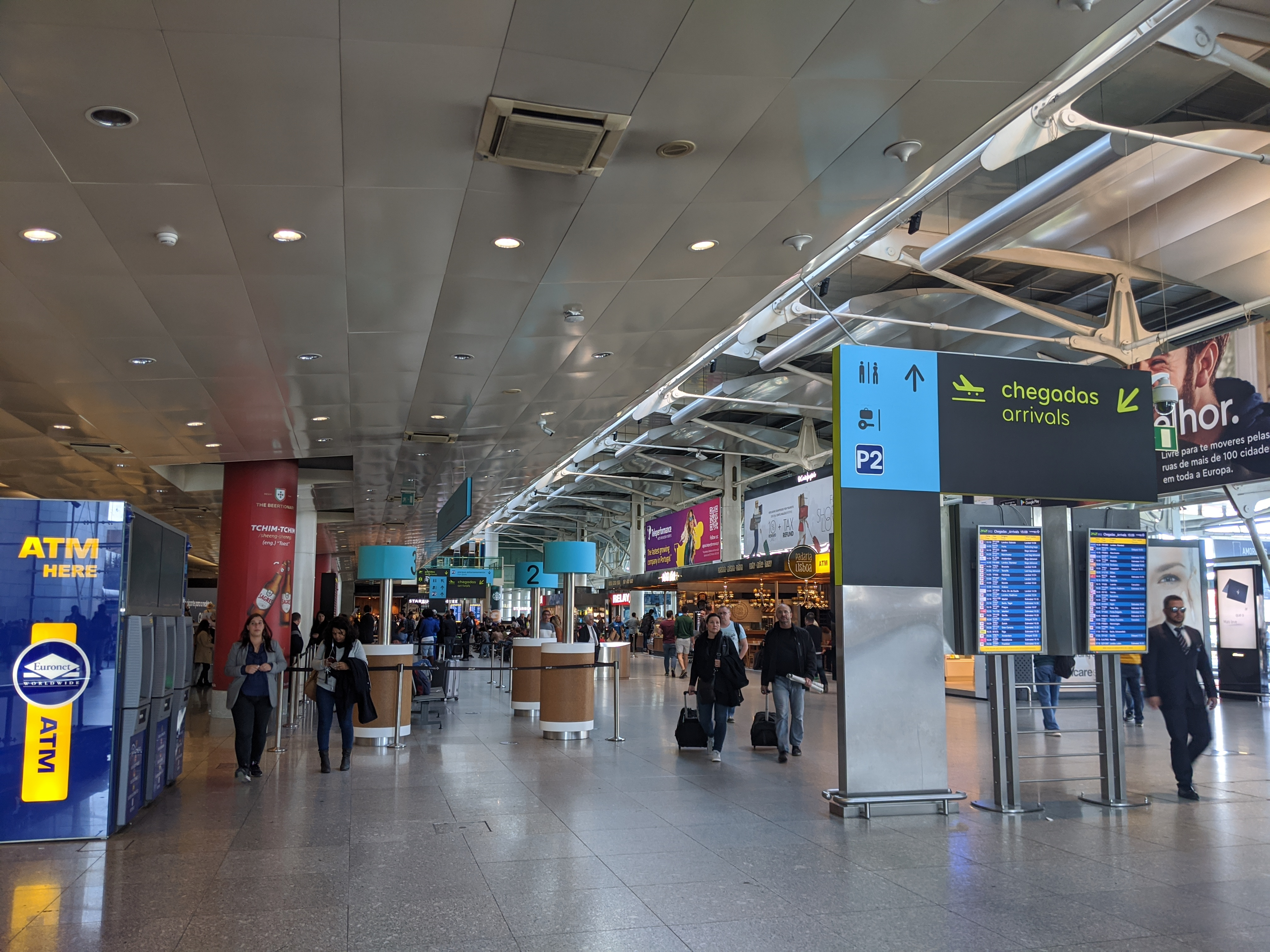
Terminal 1 arrivals area

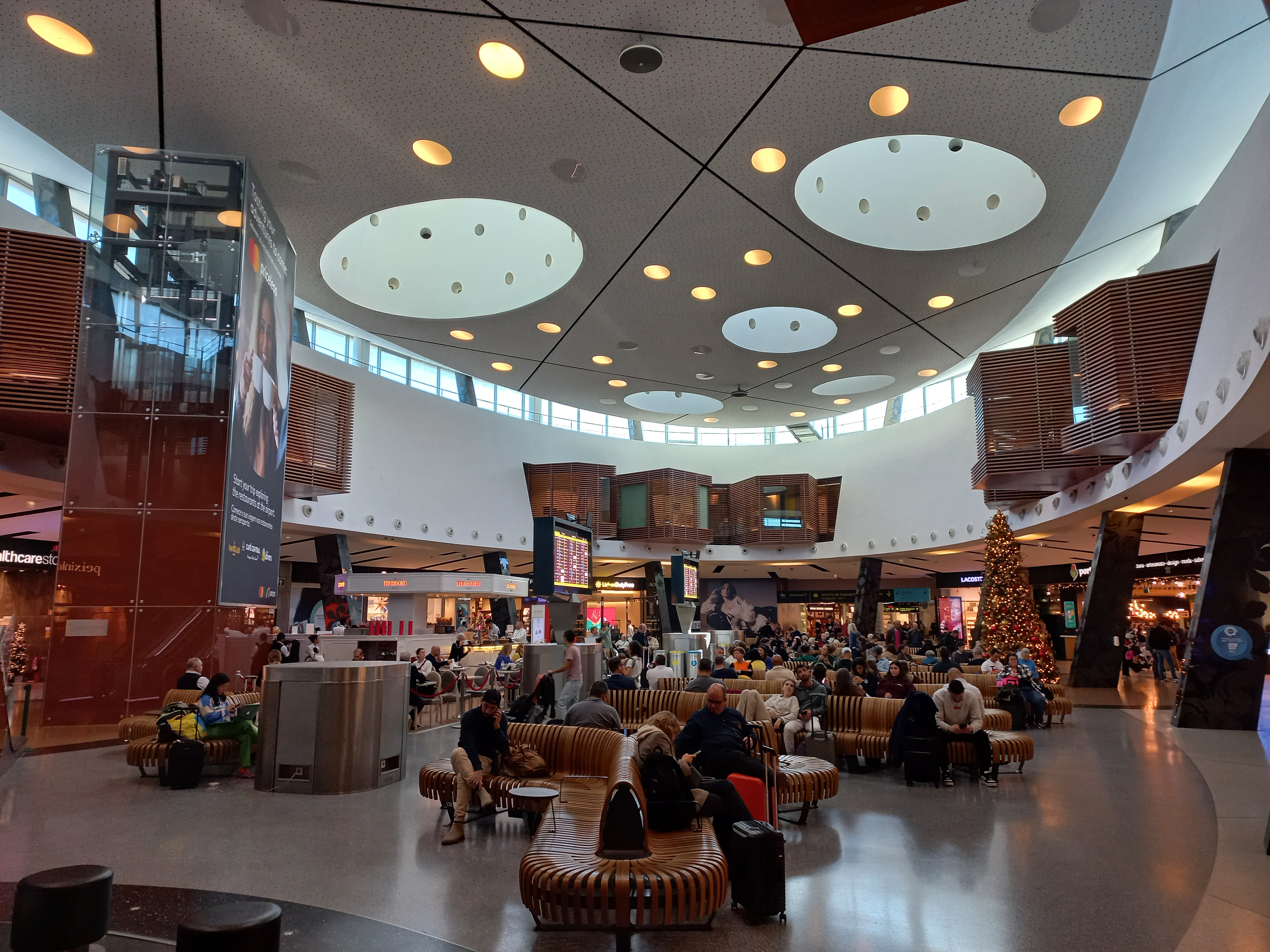
Boarding resting area on Terminal 1

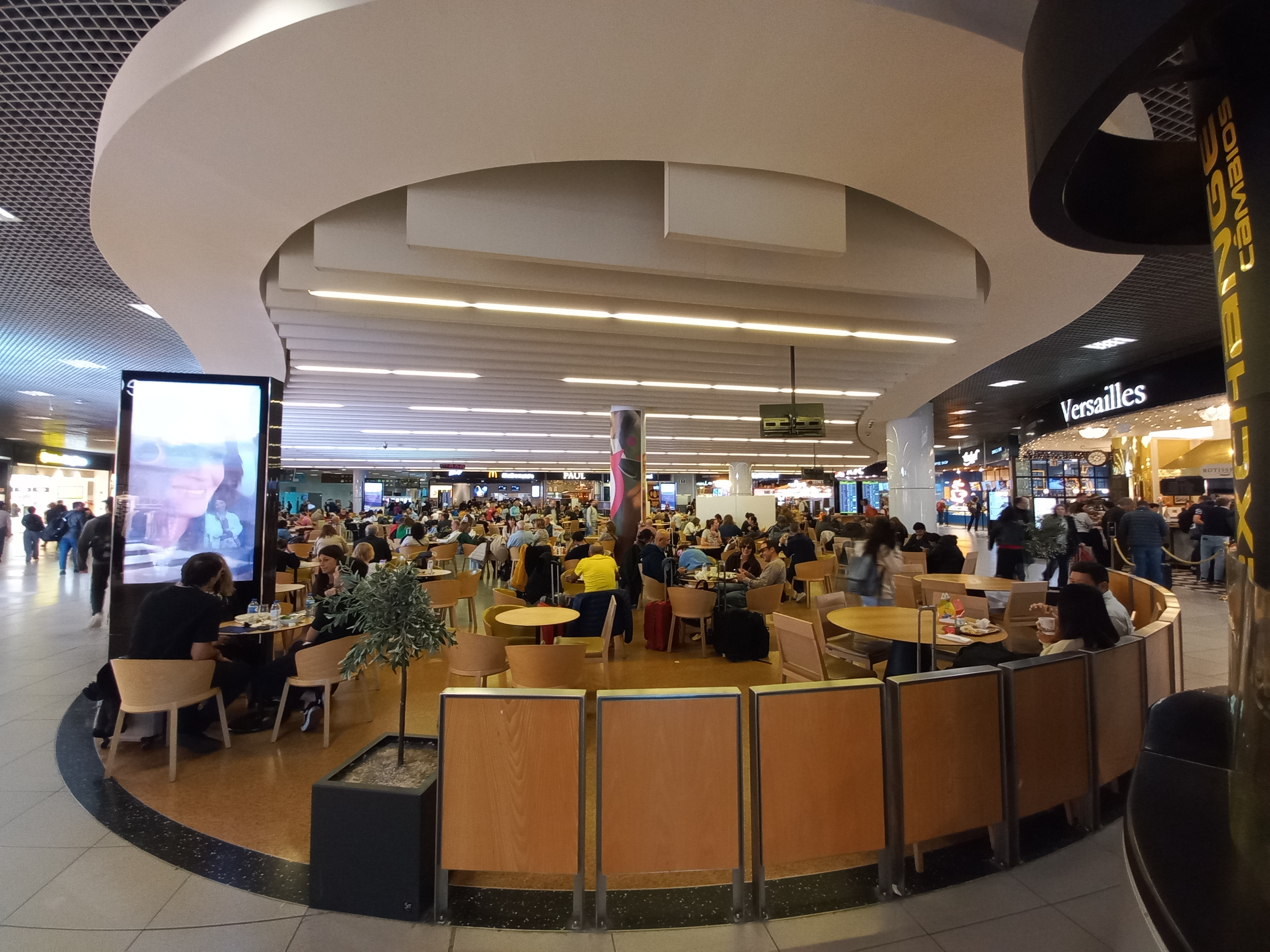
Main food court on Terminal 1

The airport opened on 15 October 1942, during World War II, and initially operated in conjunction with the Cabo Ruivo Seaplane Base: seaplanes performed transatlantic flights, and passengers were transferred onto continental flights operating from the new airport. As a neutral airport, it was open to both German and British airlines, and was a hub for smuggling people into, out of, and across Europe. It is widely referenced in the classic film Casablanca, whose plot revolves around an escape attempt to Lisbon airport. As such, it was heavily monitored by both Axis and Allied spies. Although Portugal was neutral, the airport was used by allied flights en route to Gibraltar, North Africa and Cairo.

By 1954 the number of passengers reached 100,000. A 1951–1952 airport diagram shows four runways laid out at 45-degree angles: 1,350 m (4,429 ft) Runway 5, 1,024 m (3,360 ft) Runway 9, 1,203 m (3,947 ft) Runway 14, and 1,170 m (3,839 ft) Runway 18. Runways 5 and 36 were each later extended northward to a length of 1,999 m (6,558 ft). Major upgrades from 1959 to 1962 included a new runway capable of handling the first generation of jets, such as the Boeing 707 and Douglas DC-8. The first jet aircraft flight was an Air France Caravelle in 1960. In 1962 runway 02/20 came into use. It was 3,130 m (10,269 ft) long and would allow direct transatlantic flights. The first direct flight to New York was operated by TWA with a Boeing 707, who later operated the first Boeing 747 service in 1970. When TAP ordered the 747 in 1972, five large parking bays were built, and the terminal was enlarged. A major upgrade to the buildings and facilities commenced in 1983, and the first air bridges were added in 1991.

Along with the airports in Porto, Faro, Ponta Delgada, Santa Maria, Horta, Flores, Madeira, and Porto Santo, the airport's concessions to provide support to civil aviation were conceded to ANA Aeroportos de Portugal on 18 December 1998, under provisions of decree 404/98. With this concession, ANA became responsible for the planning, development and construction of future infrastructure.

=== Airport expansion ===
The construction of Terminal 2 was concluded and operational since August 2007. Expansion of Terminal 1 with new boarding gates was concluded in 2011. A large new shopping and restaurant area, new airbridges and parking positions, a more efficient use of currently existing structures, and a new underground Lisbon Metro station were inaugurated in July 2012. In October 2010, easyJet opened a new base at Lisbon Airport, using Terminal 2 for departures. In 2022, the airline moved to Terminal 1.

Between 2007 and 2013, Lisbon Airport underwent several structural and equipment improvements and expansions. These included the construction of Terminal 2, lighting and baggage claim refurbishment, new cargo facilities, fuel storage, north pier and boarding lounge, north bus gate and baggage claim, enlargement of express cargo facilities, electrical refurbishments, departure lounge refurbishments and underground station and other terminal improvements all of which have been completed. In July 2013, a new commercial area was inaugurated in the Terminal 1 air side area with 20 new stores and spacious naturally lighted internal circulation areas.

In July 2015, a significantly larger food court was introduced, catering to more tastes and delicacies.

In January 2019, Portugal's government unveiled a €1.1 billion plan to expand the airport. Although the airport is at capacity, the expansion faces opposition due to impacts on pollution and noise. Construction began in December 2024 on the expansion of Terminal 1, with 10 new jet bridges and more space for apron. The expansion project is expected to be completed by 2027 and increase the airport's capacity to receive up to 50 million passengers per year.

=== Planned closure ===
The airport is expected to be shut down after the Lisbon Luís de Camões Airport, in the current site of the Field Firing Range of Alcochete, 40 km (25 mi) by road from Lisbon, is fully operational, expected in 2034.

Initially, the airport was to be replaced by the Ota Airport, a planned airport in Ota, a village 50 km (31 mi) north of Lisbon. In 2007, an independent study coordinated by the Portuguese Industry Confederation (CIP) suggested a site in Alcochete Municipality as an alternative location. The site is occupied by a military training facility, which would be moved to another location. A second government-contracted study led by the National Laboratory of Civil Engineering (LNEC) concluded in late 2007 that Alcochete was the best location. The selection of Alcochete was announced on 10 January 2008, more than 35 years after the first capacity increase studies were initiated. The Portuguese government announced that Alcochete was the preliminary choice, to be finalised after public consultation. The location of Alcochete as the construction site of the future Lisbon Airport was confirmed by the government on 8 May 2008, but the contract was shelved as part of Portugal's cost-cutting austerity measures, and completely dismissed from Portugal's transportation strategy plans in July 2013, with investment being concentrated on expanding and further improving the existing Lisbon Airport infrastructure.

== Naming ==
In February 2015, Lisbon city council unanimously agreed to propose that the name of Lisbon International Airport, known as Portela due to its geographical location, be changed to Humberto Delgado Airport. The proposal, tabled by the Socialist leadership under former Mayor António Costa, was agreed to by councillors from across party lines.

The Portuguese government under then Prime Minister António Costa, announced in February 2016 that Lisbon Portela Airport would be renamed on 15 May 2016 after Humberto Delgado, in memory of the late Portuguese air force general and famous politician. "He was an opposition figure to the dictatorship regime... and had a very important role in the field of civil aviation," Minister of Planning and Infrastructure Pedro Marques said at a press conference after the meeting of Council of Ministers, stressing that it was Humberto Delgado who presided over the foundation of Portugal's flagship airline TAP and "so it is very fair this assignment name to the airport". 2016 marks the 110th anniversary of the birth of Humberto Delgado, who was also known as the "Fearless General" due to his staunch opposition to Salazar's rule and his participation in the 1958 Portuguese presidential election.

== Terminals ==
Airport Map

Lisbon Humberto Delgado Airport features two passenger terminal buildings:

Terminal 2 is used by six scheduled low-cost flight airlines for departures to European destinations, while Terminal 1 handles all arrivals and regular scheduled and chartered flights. A free shuttle bus connects the two and runs every ten minutes.

=== Terminal 1 ===
Terminal 1 is the main building and features large landside and airside areas containing several shops and service facilities. It consists of two check-in halls: the older one has been converted into TAP Air Portugal's self check-in area, and the newer one housing 68 desks (37–89 and 90–106). The joint departures area features 47 gates (17 of which are equipped with jet-bridges) with 21 of them designated to non-Schengen destinations.

=== Terminal 2 ===
Terminal 2 is the much smaller, newer of the two terminals in the airport, used exclusively by low-cost carriers. It is located away from Terminal 1 on the southern border of the airport perimeter. It has 22 check-in desks (201–222), designated to each particular low-cost carrier, and ten departure gates (201–207 Schengen and 210-212 Non Schengen) using mainly walk boarding but also bus. There are only standard facilities, a few shops and service counters. The terminal is reachable via the free airport shuttle service from Terminal 1.

== Airlines and destinations ==
The following airlines operate regular scheduled passenger flights at Lisbon Humberto Delgado Airport:

=== Passenger ===
Airlines	Destinations
Aegean Airlines	Athens
Aer Lingus	Dublin
Air Algérie	Algiers
Air Canada	Montréal–Trudeau, Toronto–Pearson
Air Europa	Madrid
Air France	Paris–Charles de Gaulle
Air Serbia	Belgrade
Air Transat	Montréal–Trudeau, Toronto–Pearson
airBaltic	Riga, Vilnius
American Airlines	Philadelphia
Arkia	Tel Aviv
Azores Airlines	Horta, Pico, Ponta Delgada, Terceira; Seasonal charter: Nador
Azul Brazilian Airlines	Campinas
Beijing Capital Airlines	Seasonal: Beijing–Daxing, Hangzhou
British Airways	London–Heathrow
Brussels Airlines	Brussels
Bulgaria Air	Seasonal: Sofia
Cabo Verde Airlines	Praia, Sal, São Vicente
Delta Air Lines	Boston, New York–JFK
easyJet	Barcelona, Basel/Mulhouse, Birmingham, Bordeaux, Bristol, Edinburgh, Funchal, Geneva, Glasgow, Liverpool, London–Gatwick, London–Luton, Luxembourg, Lyon, Madrid, Manchester, Marrakesh, Marseille, Milan–Linate, Milan–Malpensa, Nantes, Nice, Prague, Sal Zurich; Seasonal: Boa Vista, Menorca, Newcastle upon Tyne, Palermo, Palma de Mallorca, Porto Santo, Praia, São Vicente, Tirana
El Al	Tel Aviv
Emirates	Dubai–International
Etihad Airways	Abu Dhabi
euroAtlantic Airways	Bissau
Eurowings	Berlin, Cologne/Bonn, Düsseldorf, Hamburg, Hannover, Stuttgart
Finnair	Helsinki
FlyOne	Chișinău
Gol Linhas Aéreas	Rio de Janeiro–Galeão
Hi Fly	Seasonal charter: Salvador da Bahia, Zanzibar
Iberia	Madrid
Iberojet	Cancun, Punta Cana; Seasonal charter: Mauritius, Sal
Icelandair	Reykjavík–Keflavík
KLM	Amsterdam
Korean Air	Seoul–Incheon
LATAM Brasil	Fortaleza, São Paulo–Guarulhos
LOT Polish Airlines	Warsaw–Chopin
Lufthansa	Frankfurt, Munich
Luxair	Luxembourg
Neos	Seasonal: Tel Aviv
Norwegian Air Shuttle	Copenhagen, Stockholm-Arlanda; Seasonal: Oslo
Nouvelair	Seasonal charter: Djerba
Pegasus Airlines	Ankara, İzmir
Qatar Airways	Doha
Royal Air Maroc	Casablanca
Ryanair	Alicante, Barcelona, Bergamo, Berlin, Birmingham, Bologna, Budapest, Charleroi, Cologne/Bonn, Dublin, Edinburgh, Eindhoven, Funchal, Kraków, London-Stansted, Luxembourg, Madrid, Málaga, Malta, Manchester, Marrakesh, Marseille, Naples, Paris–Beauvais, Pisa, Poznań, Rome–Fiumicino, Seville, Toulouse, Valencia, Vienna, Warsaw–Modlin, Wrocław; Seasonal: Agadir, Tangier, Treviso, Venice
Scandinavian Airlines	Copenhagen; Seasonal: Stockholm
Sky Express	Athens
Smartwings	Prague; Seasonal charter: Dakar–Diass, Porto Santo
STP Airways	São Tomé
Swiss International Air Lines	Geneva, Zurich
TAAG Angola Airlines	Luanda–Agostinho Neto
TAP Air Portugal	Accra, Alicante, Amsterdam, Athens, Barcelona, Belém, Belo Horizonte, Berlin, Bilbao, Bissau, Boa Vista (CV), Bologna, Boston, Brasília, Brussels, Caracas, Casablanca, Chicago–O'Hare, Copenhagen, Curitiba, Dakar–Diass, Dublin, Düsseldorf, Faro, Fortaleza, Florence, Florianópolis, Frankfurt, Funchal, Geneva, Gran Canaria, Hamburg, Ibiza, London–Gatwick, London–Heathrow, Los Angeles, Luanda–Agostinho Neto, Luxembourg, Lyon, Maceió, Madrid, Manaus, Málaga, Manchester, Maputo, Marrakesh, Marseille, Miami, Milan–Malpensa, Montréal–Trudeau, Munich, Naples, Natal, Newark, New York–JFK, Nice, Orlando, Oslo, Paris–Orly, Ponta Delgada, Porto, Porto Alegre, Prague, Praia, Recife, Rio de Janeiro–Galeão, Rome–Fiumicino, Sal, Salvador da Bahia, Santa Maria, San Francisco, São Luís, São Paulo–Guarulhos, São Tomé, São Vicente, Seville, Tel Aviv (suspended until 27 March 2027) Tenerife–South, Terceira, Toronto–Pearson, Toulouse, Valencia, Venice, Vienna, Warsaw–Chopin, Washington–Dulles, Zurich; Seasonal: Banjul, Menorca, Palma de Mallorca, Porto Santo, Reykjavík–Keflavík (begins 1 April 2027)
Transavia	Amsterdam, Eindhoven Nantes, Paris–Orly, Rotterdam; Seasonal: Montpellier
Tunisair	Tunis; Seasonal: Monastir
Turkish Airlines	Istanbul
United Airlines	Newark, Washington–Dulles
Volotea	Asturias; Seasonal: Nantes
Vueling	Barcelona, Bilbao; Seasonal: Ibiza, Palma de Mallorca
WestJet	Seasonal: Halifax
Wizz Air	Bucharest, Budapest, Cluj-Napoca, Rome–Fiumicino, Warsaw–Chopin
World2Fly	Charter: Punta Cana; Seasonal charter: Orlando/Sanford

== Statistics ==
=== Passenger numbers ===
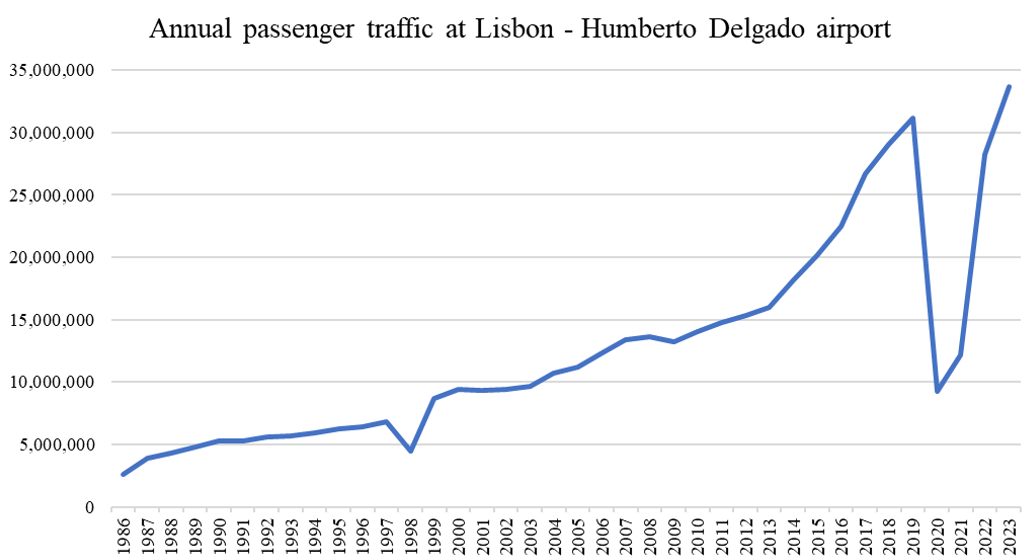
Annual passenger traffic at LIS airport.

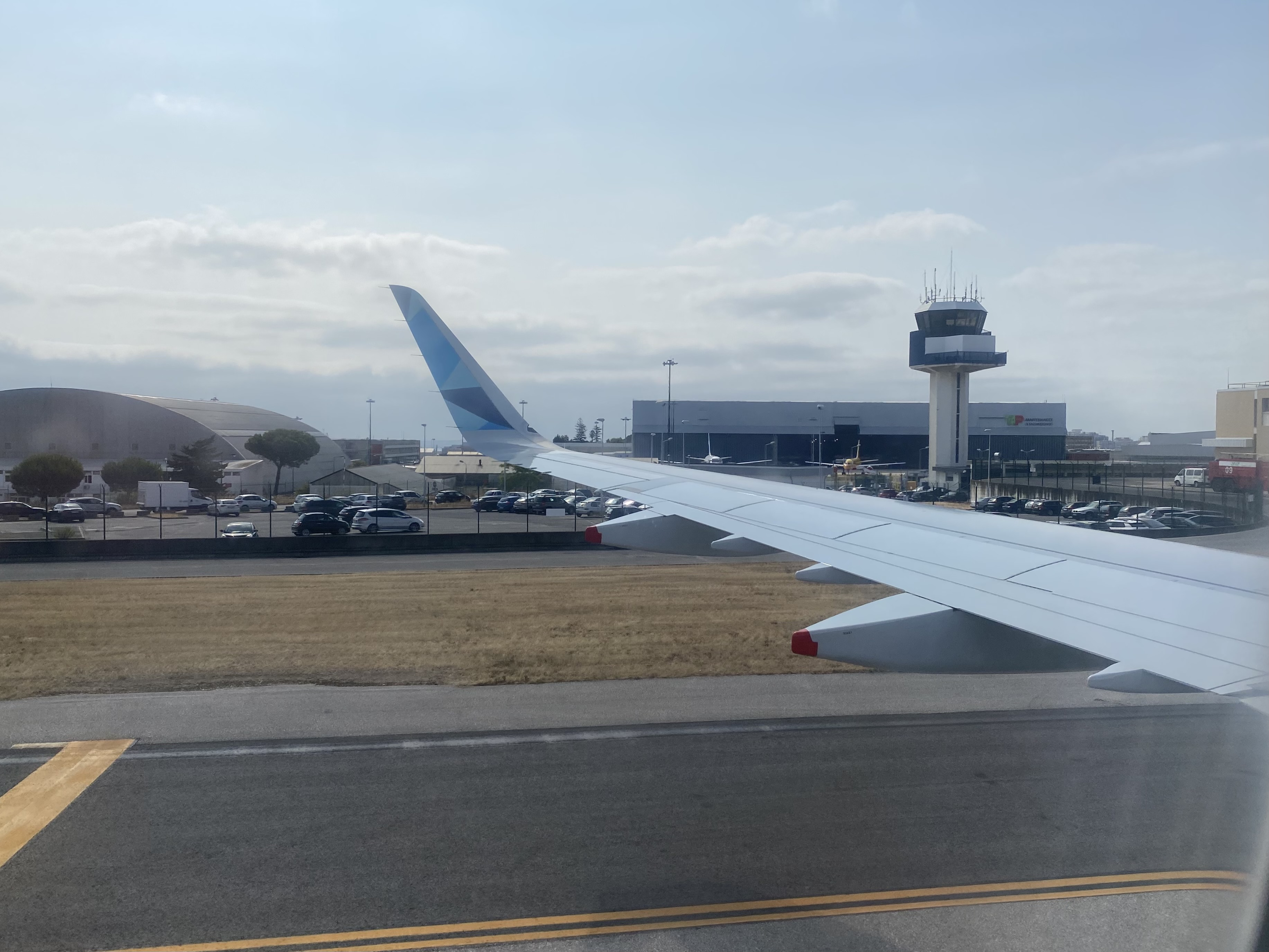
Control tower

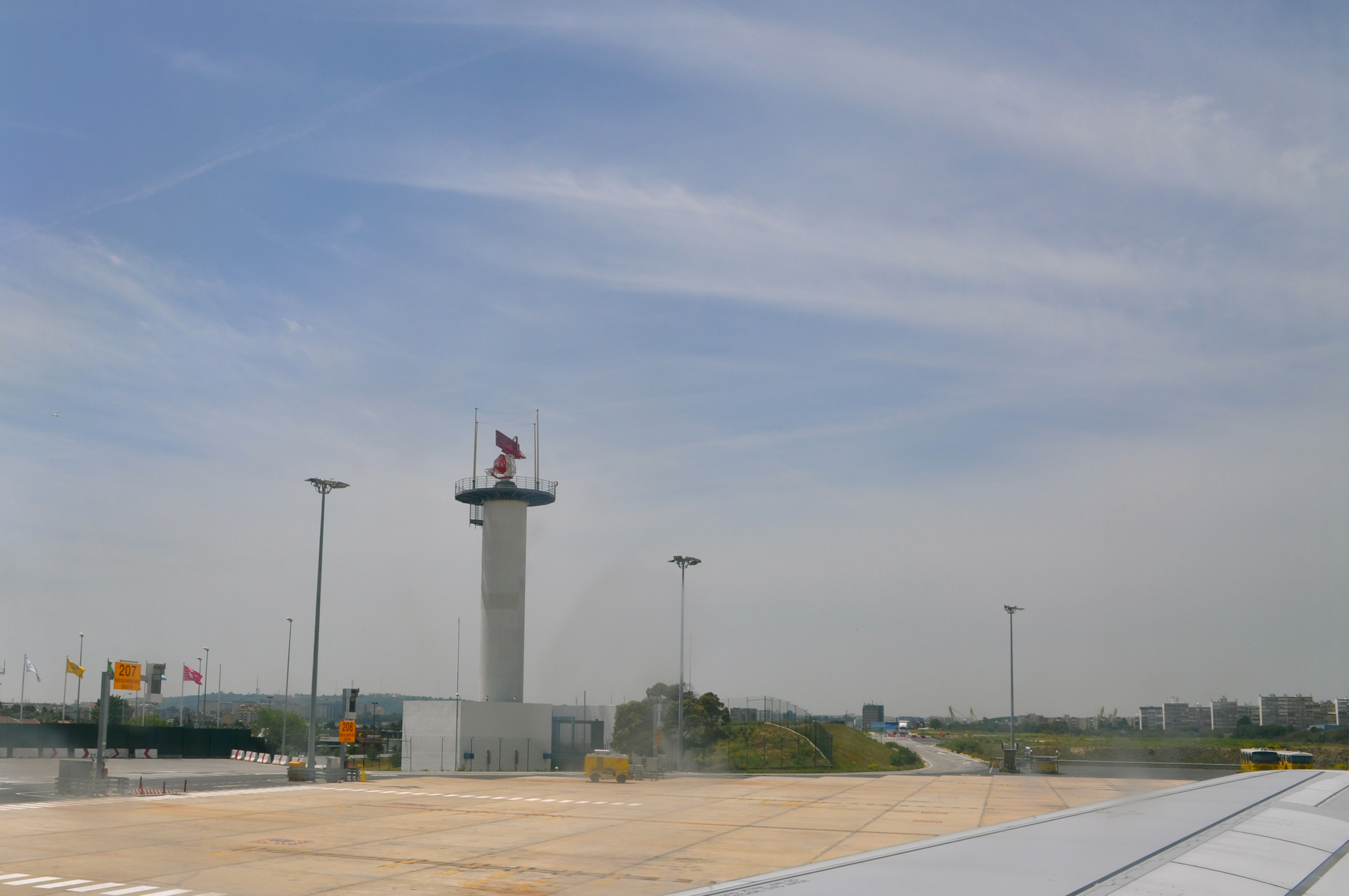
Radar Tower

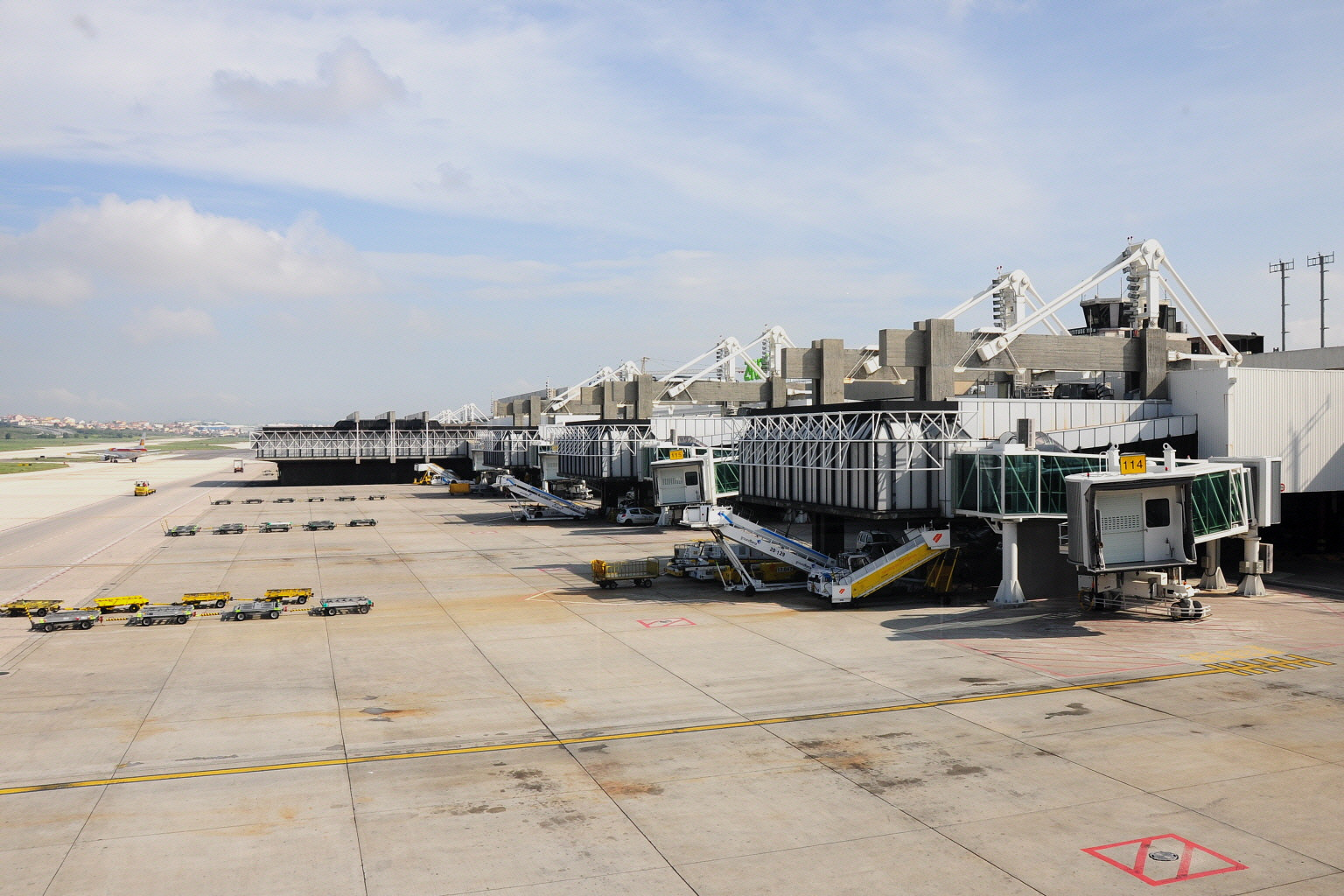
Airport boarding dock

	Passengers	% Change
2001	9,356,453	
2002	9,422,605	▲0.7%
2003	9,636,257	▲2.3%
2004	10,731,861	▲11.4%
2005	11,236,476	▲4.7%
2006	12,314,917	▲9.6%
2007	13,393,182	▲8.8%
2008	13,603,616	▲1.6%
2009	13,265,268	▼2.5%
2010	14,049,808	▲5.9%
2011	14,806,537	▲5.4%
2012	15,314,800	▲3.4%
2013	16,025,510	▲4.6%
2014	18,158,588	▲13.3%
2015	20,110,804	▲10.8%
2016	22,462,599	▲11.7%
2017	26,676,552	▲18.8%
2018	29,045,733	▲8.9%
2019	31,184,594	▲7.4%
2020	9,267,968	▼70.3%
2021	12,148,972	▲31.1%
2022	28,261,883	▲132.6%
2023	33,648,613	▲19.1%
2024	35,092,225	▲4.3%
2025	36,126,000	▲2.9%
Jan–Sep 2026	27,655,000	▲0.7%
Source: Pordata Vinci INE

=== Busiest routes ===
These tables list the busiest domestic, European and intercontinental routes from the airport.

Top 10 busiest domestic routes from Lisbon in 2024
Rank	Airport	Passengers	Airlines
1	Funchal	1,395,044	easyJet, Ryanair, TAP Air Portugal
2	Ponta Delgada	934,111	Azores Airlines, Ryanair, TAP Air Portugal
3	Porto	755,832	TAP Air Portugal
4	Terceira	318,962	Azores Airlines, Ryanair, TAP Air Portugal
5	Faro	279,862	TAP Air Portugal
6	Horta	93,758	Azores Airlines
7	Porto Santo	84,264	easyJet, Smartwings, TAP Air Portugal
8	Pico	52,720	Azores Airlines

Top 10 busiest European routes from Lisbon in 2024
Rank	Country	Airport	Passengers	Airlines
1	Spain	Madrid	1,906,228	Air Europa, easyJet, Iberia, TAP Air Portugal
2	France	Paris–Orly	1,545,371	TAP Air Portugal, Transavia France, Vueling
3	Spain	Barcelona	1,304,984	TAP Air Portugal, Vueling
4	United Kingdom	London–Heathrow	1,121,519	British Airways, TAP Air Portugal
5	Netherlands	Amsterdam	1,045,272	easyJet, KLM, TAP Air Portugal, Transavia, Vueling
6	Germany	Frankfurt	733,217	Lufthansa, TAP Air Portugal
7	Switzerland	Geneva	724,294	easyJet Switzerland, Swiss International Air Lines, TAP Air Portugal
8	Italy	Milan–Malpensa	664,606	easyJet, TAP Air Portugal
9	Italy	Rome–Fiumicino	654,069	Ryanair, TAP Air Portugal, Wizz Air
10	Switzerland	Zurich	652,212	easyJet Switzerland, Swiss International Air Lines, TAP Air Portugal

Top 10 busiest international routes from Lisbon in 2024
Rank	Country	Airport	Passengers	Airlines
1	Brazil	São Paulo–Guarulhos	864,997	LATAM Brasil, TAP Air Portugal
2	Angola	Luanda	464,375	TAAG Angola Airlines, TAP Air Portugal
3	US	Newark	456,445	TAP Air Portugal, United Airlines
4	UAE	Dubai–International	448,150	Emirates
5	Canada	Toronto–Pearson	427,884	Air Canada, Air Transat, TAP Air Portugal
6	US	Boston	337,841	Azores Airlines, Delta, TAP Air Portugal
7	Brazil	Rio de Janeiro–Galeão	319,036	TAP Air Portugal
8	Brazil	Campinas	311,274	Azul Brazilian Airlines
9	US	New York–JFK	309,939	Delta, TAP Air Portugal
10	Canada	Montréal–Trudeau	306,193	Air Canada, Air Transat, TAP Air Portugal

== Ground transportation ==
=== Train ===
Trains to all parts of the country are available at Gare do Oriente station, the main train station in Lisbon. The airport connects to the station via metro in approximately 10 minutes. Alternatively travelers can take the bus to the station, albeit with slightly longer travel times.

=== Metro ===
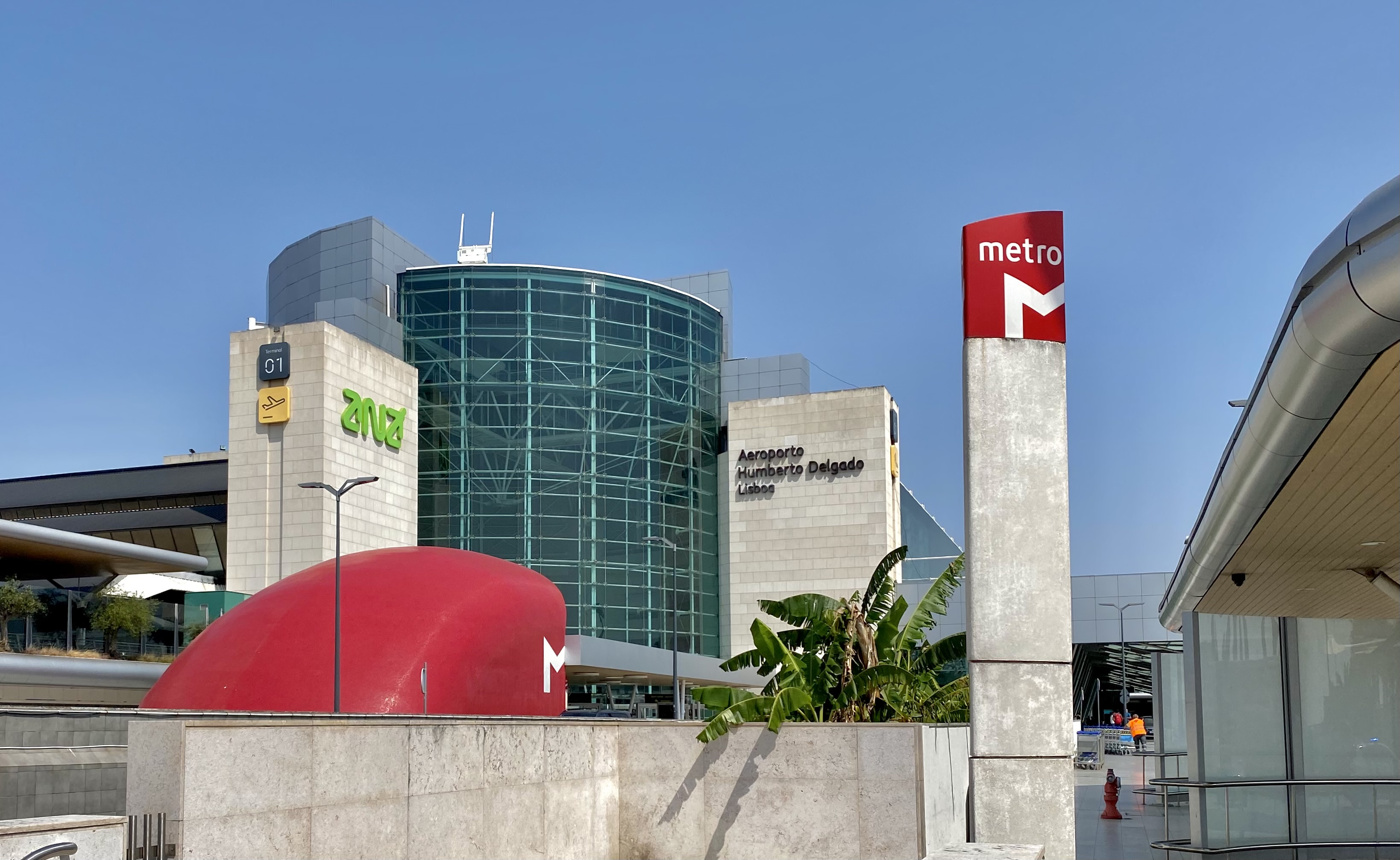
Terminal 1 front with subway station entry

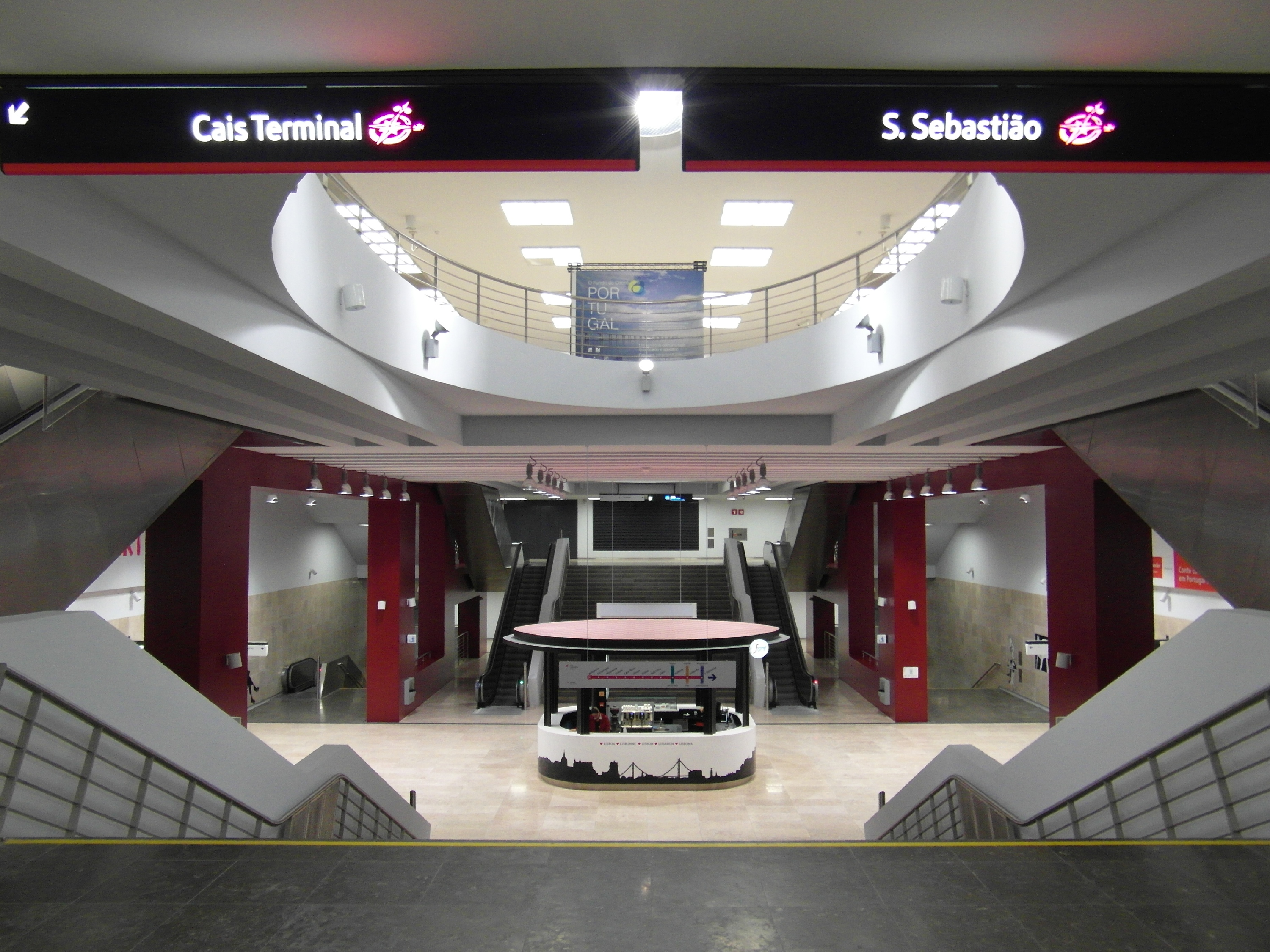
Metro de Lisboa station at Lisbon Humberto Delgado Airport

Aeroporto Metro station lies at the Southern edge of the Terminal 1 arrivals area. The Aeroporto Saldanha line takes approximately 20 minutes to reach downtown Lisbon. To use the metro, passengers can purchase a 7 Colinas/Viva Viagem card, which can be topped up and used on the metro and bus network. Alternatively, contactless payment is accepted at the metro gates, but this is not valid on other modes of transport in the city.

=== Bus ===
Carris city buses stop at the airport arrivals section, and connect to Marquis of Pombal Square, and Amoreiras. Night routes run to downtown Baixa, as well as Cais do Sodré and Gare do Oriente train stations.

==== Aerobus ====
The Aerobus was a shuttle bus that connected the airport with the city centre. The bus line was discontinued in 2023.

==== Shuttle ====
Shuttles are available to transport travelers around the airport, and to locations not serviced by aerobuses.

=== Taxi ===
Lisbon city taxis are readily available 24 hours a day outside the arrival and departure areas of the airport. A trip to Lisbon city centre by taxi takes approximately 15 minutes.

=== Car ===
The airport is easily accessible by several major highways and main roads. ANA operates several covered and open parking areas. Valet service, car hire, and chauffeur limousine services are also available.

=== Bicycle ===
Two bicycle paths connect the airport roundabout, situated 300 m (1,000 ft) south of Terminal 1 to the city's 70 km (43-mile) cycle infrastructure network.

== Other facilities ==
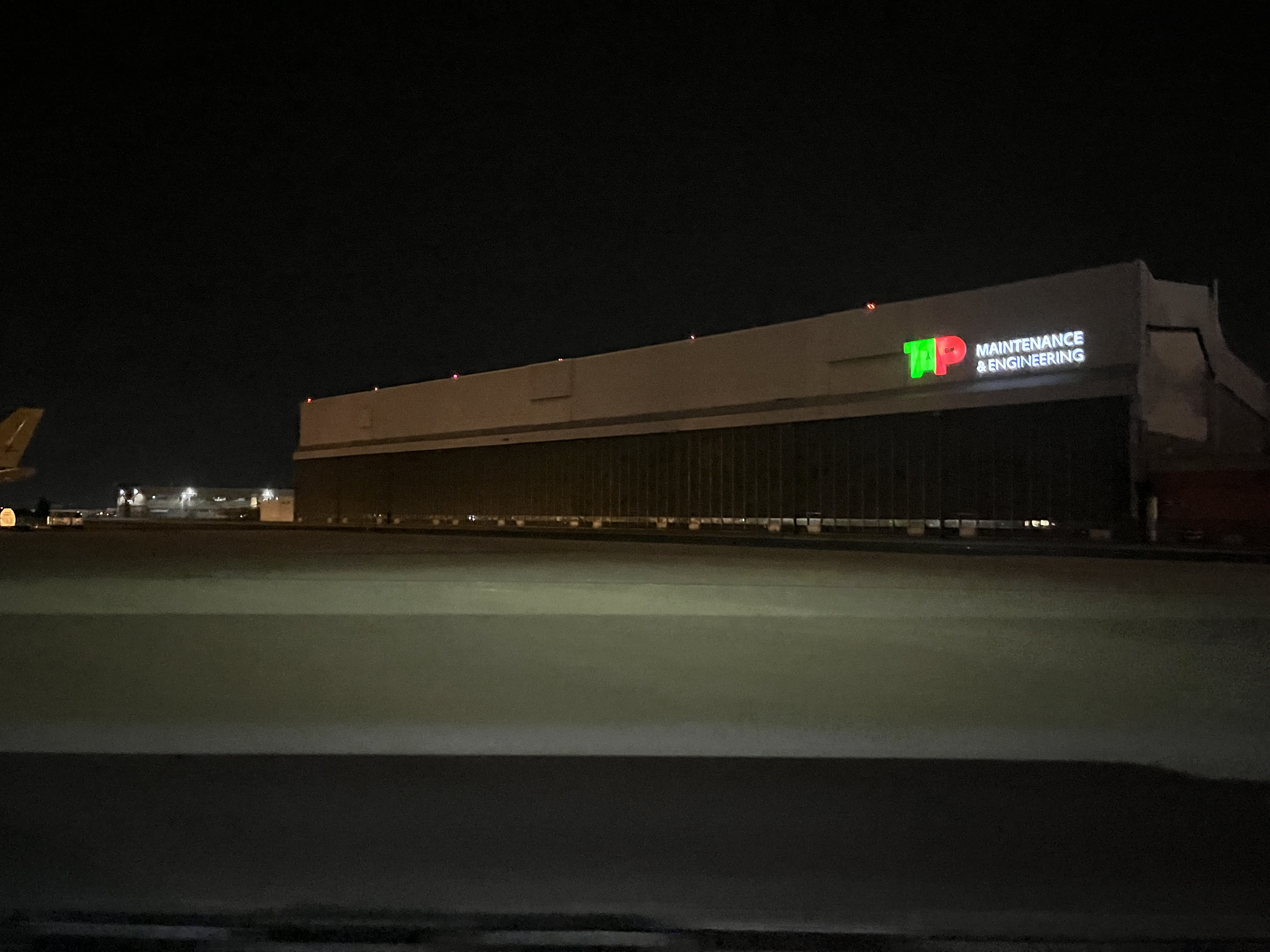
TAP Air Portugal maintenance hangar

TAP Air Portugal has a complex at Lisbon Airport housing many head offices and the TAP Museum Archives, where visitors can make appointments to view materials including photographs, advertising material, flight logs and manuals. The complex is 22.45 hectares (55 1/2 acres) in area. In 1989 TAP became the owner of the complex due to a governmental decree. TAP's head office is in Building 25. The TAP subsidiary Serviços Portugueses de Handling, S.A. (SPdH) has its head office on the 6th floor of Building 25. Sociedade de Gestão e Serviços, S.A. (TAPGER), another TAP subsidiary, has its head office on the 8th floor of the same building. Building 19 has the head office of Sociedade de Serviços e Engenharia Informática, S.A. (Megasis), a TAP information services subsidiary. The TAP documentation and archive is in the annex of Building 19. Building 34, on the far north side of the complex, houses the company's new data processing centre.

ANA Aeroportos de Portugal has its head office in Building 120. Portugália has its head office in Building 70. The TAP catering subsidiary, Catering de Portugal, S.A. (CATERINGPOR), has its head office in Building 59. Cuidados Integrados de Saúde, S.A. (UCS) is based out of Building 35.

== Accidents and incidents ==
- On 12 April 1959, a Douglas C-47 of the Portuguese Air Force crashed into the Tagus river estuary (near Carcavelos) shortly after takeoff, killing all 11 people on board.
- On 4 December 1980, a Cessna 421 carrying Prime Minister of Portugal Francisco de Sá Carneiro and other government officials, crashed into buildings in Camarate seconds after takeoff, killing all 7 persons on board.

== See also ==
- Transport in Portugal
- List of airports in Portugal
- List of eponyms of airports
