= National Authority of Civil Aviation of Portugal =

Portuguese government agency

Portuguese Civil Aviation Authority
- Autoridade Nacional de Aviação Civil

Agency overview
- Formed: 27 April 2007
- Preceding agency: Autoridade Nacional de Aviação Civil
- Jurisdiction: Government of Portugal
- Headquarters: Lisbon Portela Airport; 38°46′53″N 9°8′10″W
- Agency executive: Luís Miguel Silva Ribeiro, Managing Director
- Website: www.anac.pt

Footnotes
- Sources: ANAC,

The Portuguese Civil Aviation Authority (Portuguese: Autoridade Nacional de Aviação Civil), often shortened to ANAC, is the civil aviation authority of Portugal. It oversees all aspects of civil aviation within the Portuguese territory and all its dependencies.

The ANAC was created on 27 April 2007 to succeed the former National Institute of Civil Aviation (Portuguese: Instituto Nacional de Aviação Civil), which had been created on 15 May 1998 for taking over the General Directorate of Civil Aviation (Portuguese: Direcção-Geral da Aviação Civil).

The body is organised into a Directorate Council which is in turn sub-divided into five Directorates and three Cabinets, a Consultant Council, and a Finance Council. It has its headquarters in Lisbon Airport.

== See also ==
- List of civil aviation authorities
- TAP Air Portugal
