= Portuguese Environment Agency =

Government agency in Portugal

- Agência Portuguesa do Ambiente
- Formation: 2012
- Type: Government agency
- Headquarters: Amadora, Portugal
- President: Nuno Lacasta
- Website: https://apambiente.pt/

The Portuguese Environment Agency (APA, Portuguese: Agência Portuguesa do Ambiente) is a public institute within the scope of the Portuguese Ministry of the Environment, responsible for the implementation of environmental policies in Portugal. It was created in 2012 from the merger of several environment and hydrography-related institutions and commissions.
