= Baleal Island =

Island in Portugal

Coordinates: 39.3731°N 9.3389°W

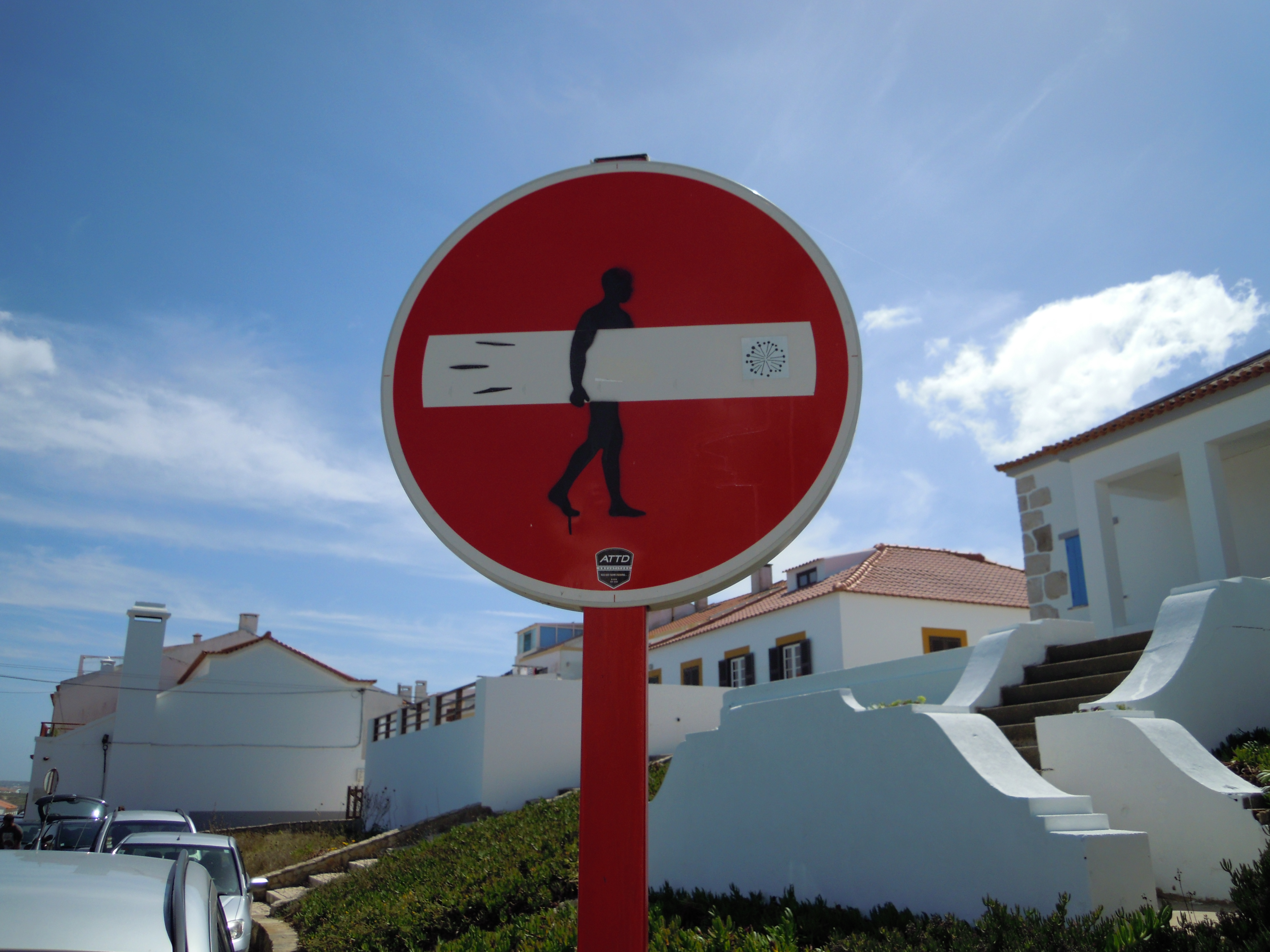
A street sign in Baleal graffitied to emphasise its surfing connection

Baleal is a small island located 3 kilometres (1.9 miles) north of Peniche, in the Oeste region of Portugal; the island is separated from the mainland by a tombolo. At the extremity of the island, one can find the inaccessible ilhota das Pombas and the ilhéu de Fora. Baleal has a past related to whaling. This small island was the site of the cutting and carving of whales on their migratory route to the northern seas.

Located in the region of Peniche, Baleal has become a major vacation spot with a potential for water sports almost unmatched in Europe. The coastal shape, namely the bay and northern strip of coast associated with Baleal, create unique conditions in Europe for surfing and body boarding.
