= Tagus Estuary Natural Reserve =

Protected area in Portugal

- Reserva Natural do Estuário do Tejo
- IUCN category IV (habitat/species management area)
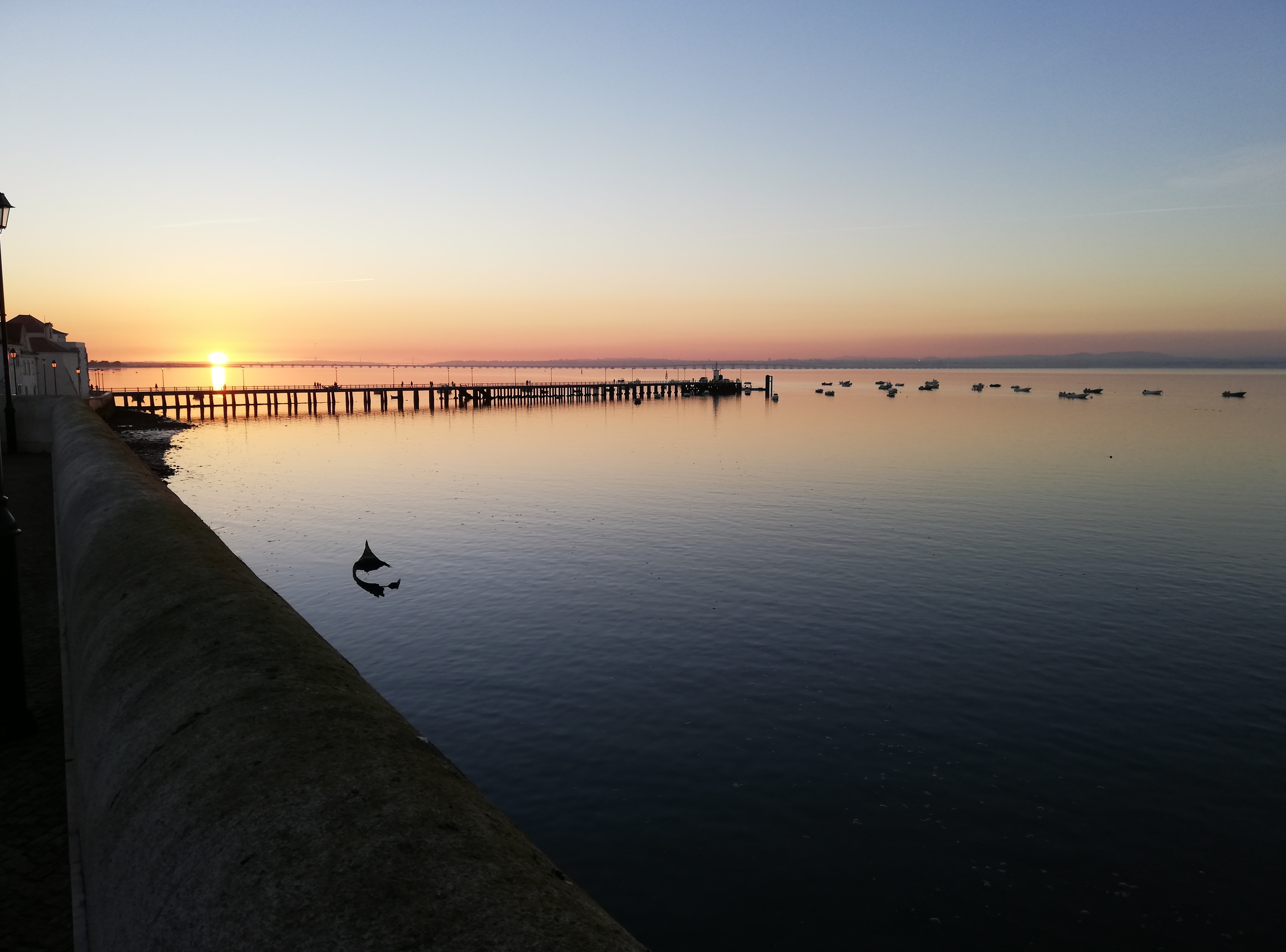
- Tagus Estuary, seen from Alcochete.

- Location within Portugal
- Location: Lisbon District, Portugal
- Nearest city: Lisbon
- Coordinates: 38°49′16″N 8°59′35″W
- Area: 14,192 ha (35,070 acres)
- Established: 1976

Ramsar Wetland
- Official name: Estuário do Tejo
- Designated: 24 November 1980
- Reference no.: 211

Tagus Estuary Natural Reserve (Portuguese: Reserva Natural do Estuário do Tejo) is a natural reserve in Portugal. It is one of the 30 areas which are officially under protection in the country. The estuary of the Tagus River is the largest wetland in the country and one of the most important in Europe, a sanctuary for fish, molluscs, crustaceans, and especially to birds that stop-over on their migration between northern Europe and Africa. It is the largest estuary in western Europe, with about 34,000 hectares (84,000 acres), and regularly hosts 50,000 wintering waterfowl.

== Characterization ==
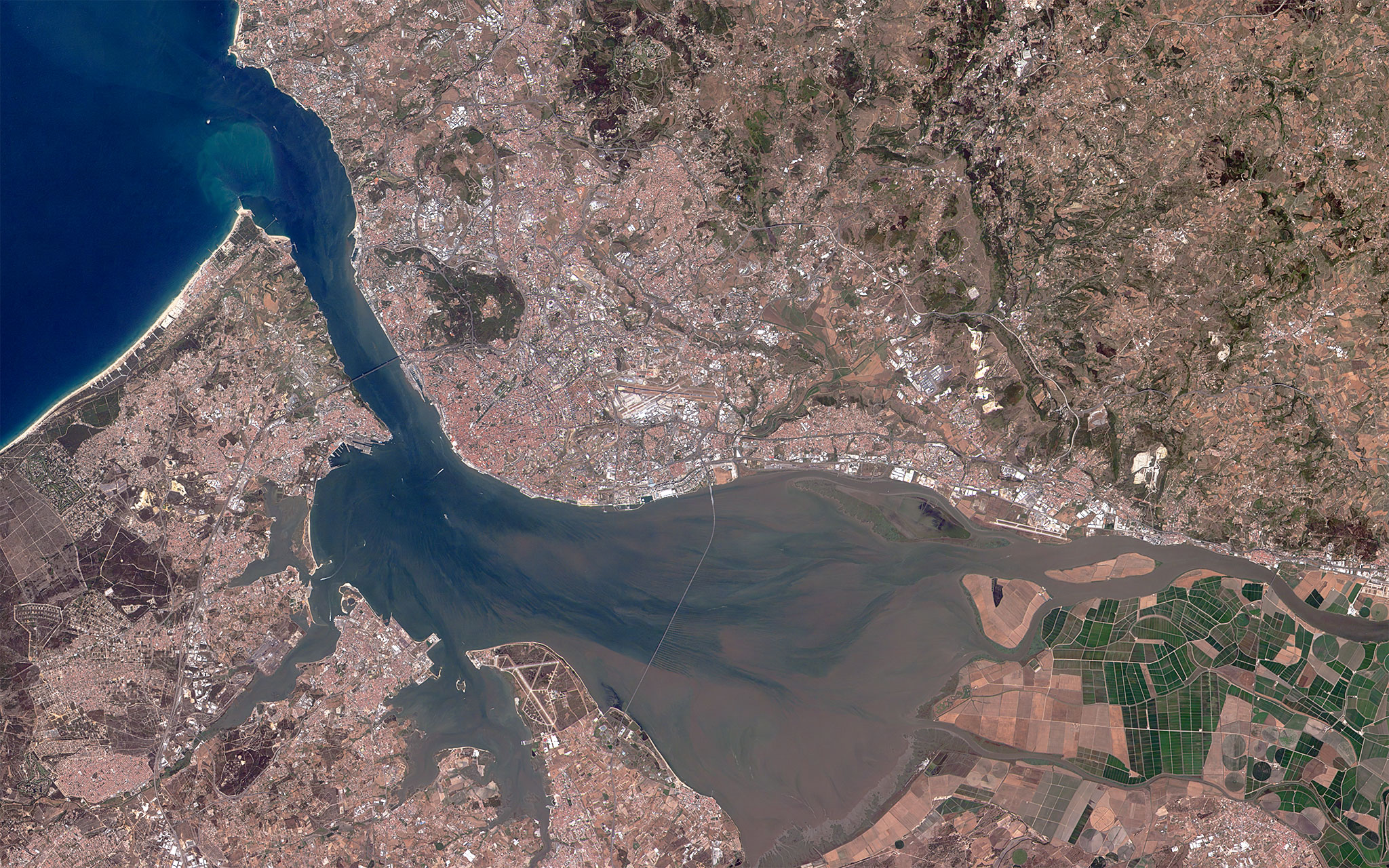
Tagus Estuary (satellite view) marking the transition between the Tagus river (right) and the Atlantic Ocean (upper left)

The Nature Reserve was established in 1976, covering an area of 14,192 hectares (35,070 acres), characterized by an extensive surface of estuarine waters, vast fields intersected by creeks, marshes, salt flats and alluvial agricultural land (marshlands).

Not exceeding 11 metres (36 ft) above sea level and a depth of 10 metres (33 ft), distributed over the counties of Alcochete, Benavente and Vila Franca de Xira, the reserve falls mostly in the upstream area of the estuary of the Tagus which, with an area extending over about 32 km^{2} (12 sq mi), is the largest in Western Europe.

Around the estuary a saltmarsh has developed which is a zone of high productivity of polychaetes, molluscs and crustaceans, is an important breeding area for various fish species. However, it is the water birds which give the Tagus estuary its international importance. The flocks of wintering species reach up to about 120,000 individuals. The counts regularly carried out in this protected area during the winter show more than 10,000 ducks and 50,000 shorebirds. In the case of the pied avocet (Recurvirostra avosetta), up to 25% of the population wintering in Europe has been counted on the Tagus Estuary. The many other species present attest to the biological richness and value for nature conservation in this region: the greater flamingo (Phoenicopterus roseus), greylag goose (Anser anser), the dunlin (Calidris alpina), black-tailed godwit (Limosa limosa), hen harrier (Circus cyaneus), osprey (Pandion haliaetus), bluethroat (Luscina svecica), common firecrest (Regulus ignicapillus) and Eurasian penduline tit (Remiz pendulinus).

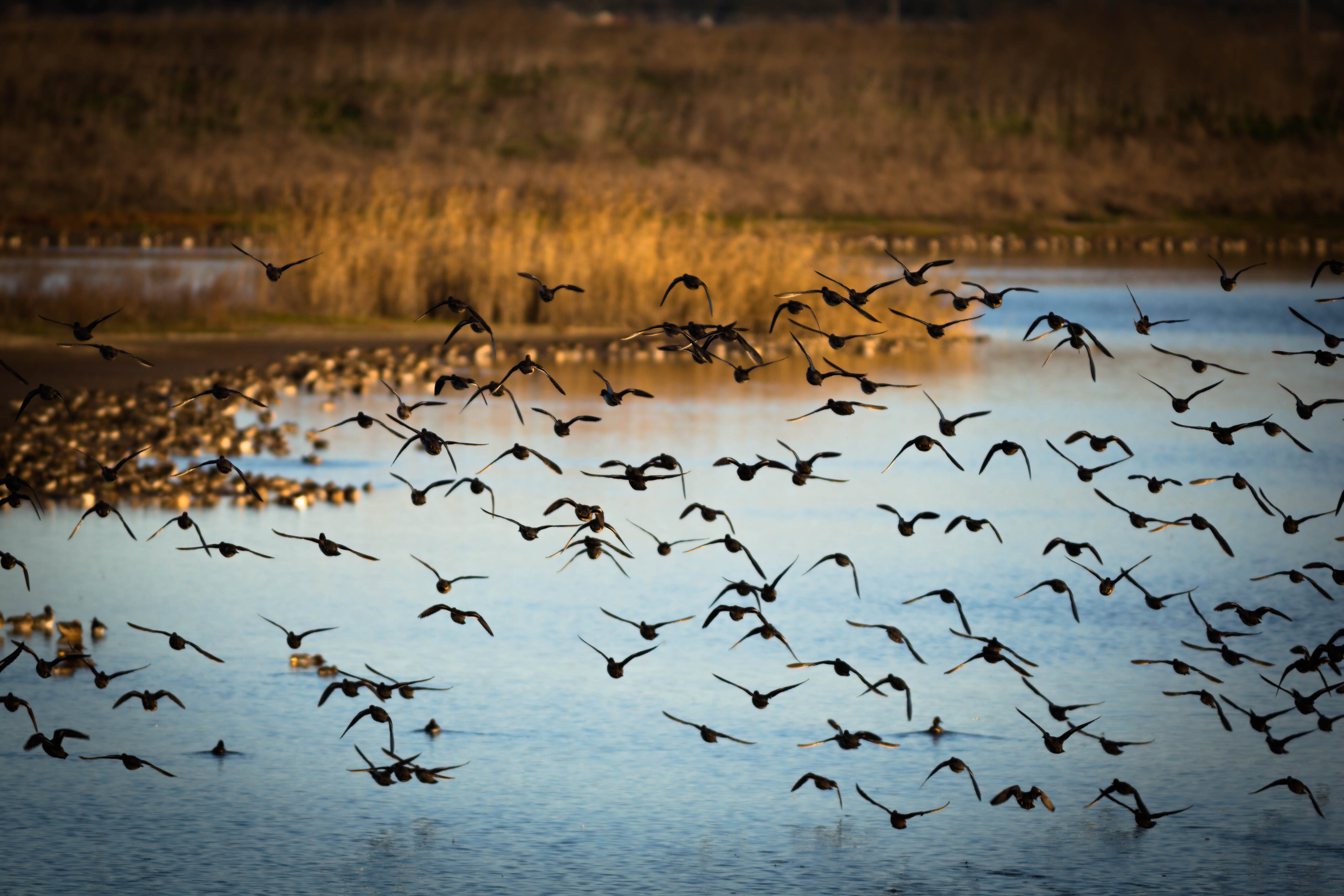
The Tagus Estuary hosts a number of migratory bird species

In the wetlands around the estuary nesting birds include red-crested pochard (Netta rufina), little bittern (Ixobrychus minutus), little egret (Egretta garzetta) and purple heron (Ardea purpurea), marsh harrier (Circus aeruginosus], Montagu's harrier (Circus pyagurgus), black-winged stilt (Himantopus himantopus), collared pratincole (Glareola pratincola) and little tern (Sternula albifrons). While the associated redbeds contain great reed warbler (Acrocephalus arundinaceus), Savi's warbler (Locustella luscinioides) and other warblers. The nearby fields have stone-curlew (Burhinus oedicnemus) and calandra lark (Melanocorypha calandra) breed on adjacent farmland. Little bustard (Tetrax tetrax) occurs all year but is more numerous in winter. Raptors which may be seen over the fields include black-winged kite (Elanus caeruleus), short-toed eagle (Circaetus gallicus) and booted eagle (Aquila pennatus).

Nearby patches of woodland hold short-toed treecreeper (Certhia brachydactyla), European nightjar (Caprimulgus europaeus), red-necked nightjar (Caprimulgus ruficollis), Iberian magpie (Cyanopica cooki) and many passerines.

During the Spring and Autumn many species stopover on the Tagus during their migration these include curlew sandpiper (Calidris ferruginea) in large numbers with many other shorebirds in smaller numbers, common redshank (Tringa totanus) and black-tailed godwits reach their peak numbers during migration too. Other migrants which may be seen include Eurasian spoonbill (Platalea alba), Mediterranean gull (Larus melanocephalus) and black tern (Chlidonias niger) and many passerines.

== Conservation status ==
- 1976 - The Natural Reserve of the Tagus Estuary is created through Decree-Law No. 565/76.
- 1980 - The reserve is designated as Wetlands of International Importance by the Ramsar Convention.
- 1994 - a Special Protection Area for Wild Birds is established under Directive 79/409/EEC.
