= Field Firing Range of Alcochete =

Coordinates: 38.775522°N 8.883683°W

Campo de Tiro
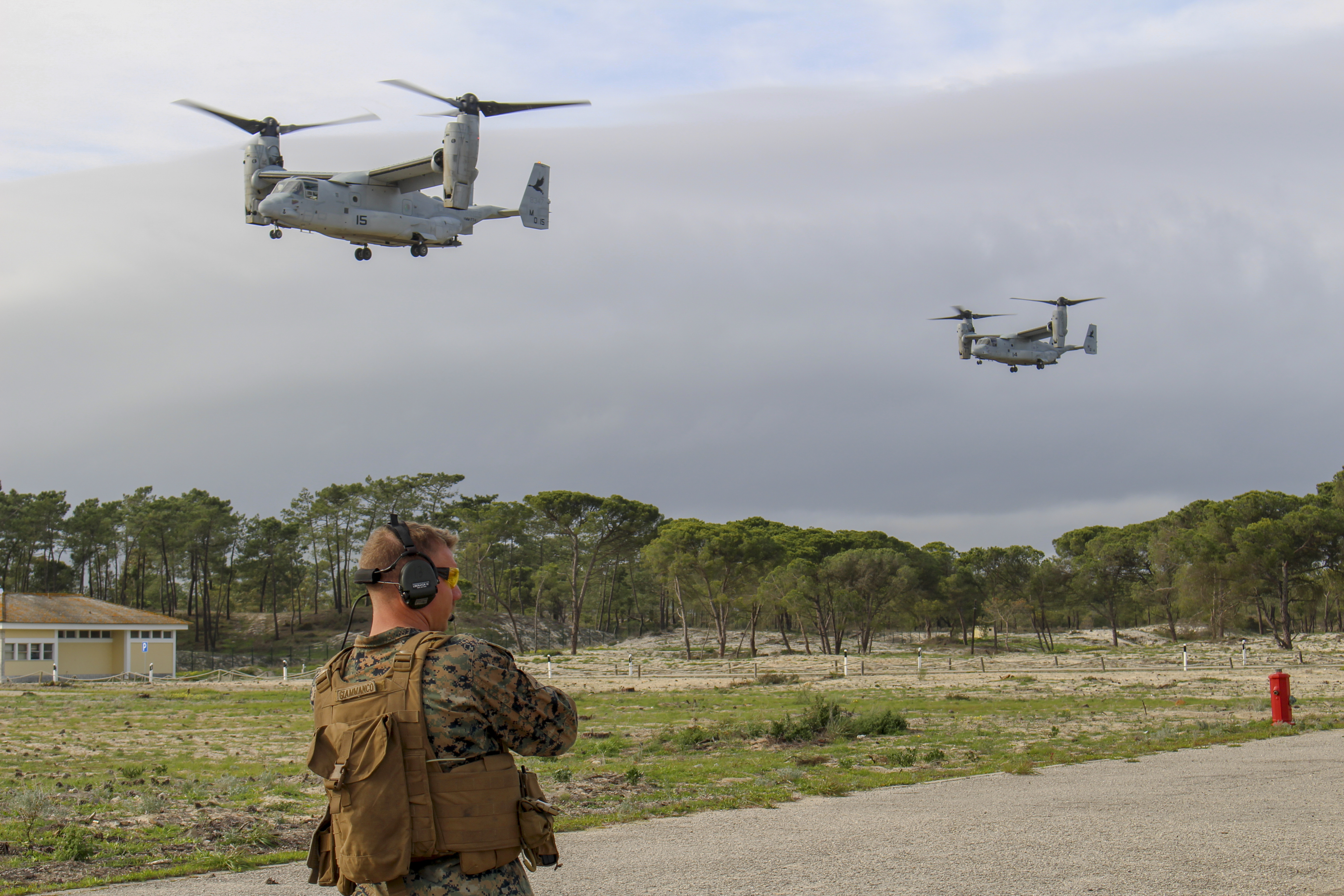
- Exercise between Portuguese Fuzileiros and US Marines at Alcochete Firing Range.
- Active: 24 March 1904 (establishment); 26 February 1993 (PoAF unit)
- Country: Portugal
- Branch: Portuguese Air Force
- Motto: O Saber da Experiência Feito

Commanders
- Commander: Colonel Manuel Francisco Bernardo da Costa
- Taking Office: 22 July 2021

The Field Firing Range (Portuguese: Campo de Tiro, CT), also known as the Field Firing Range of Alcochete (Portuguese: Campo de Tiro de Alcochete, CTA), is a military firing and bombing range located near the town of Alcochete, on land administratively part of the civil parishes of Samora Correia (in Benavente municipality) and Canha (in Montijo municipality), in Lisbon and Tagus Valley region, Portugal. Established in 1904, it is since 1993 a facility of the Portuguese Air Force (PoAF). It covers 7,539 hectares and provides the PoAF and other branches of the Portuguese Armed Forces, national law enforcement agencies and defense industries, with the necessary space and safety to execute exercises, training and testing involving live ammunition and weapon systems. As part of its activities, the range has a permanent bomb disposal unit and its security is handled by the Polícia Aérea.

The range is also home to a natural reserve which helps preserve flora and the existing wildlife, such as partridge, wild boar, little bustard, fox, common genet and rabbit. For preservation of its surroundings and natural life, the range has obtained an environmental management certificate (ISO 14001), in 2001, which has been regularly renewed over the years. Since 1998 the range also has a photovoltaic plant that powers its facilities.

The Field Firing Range of Alcochete is planned to close and relocate to Alter do Chão, owing to the construction of Luís de Camões Airport (planned to open in 2034).

== History ==
The range was created by royal decree on March 24, 1904, but dates back to 1896, when the Portuguese Army started acquiring the land necessary to establish a new artillery firing range. It was created mainly because the then existing range at Vendas Novas was not large enough to safely train with new artillery pieces being taken into service.

Its first operational use was on September 18, 1904, when it was employed in testing the recently acquired French Schneider-Canet Bocage howitzers. After reorganization of the Ministry of War, the area was later seen as unnecessary and its sale was considered, thus it was abandoned and had its equipment transferred to the School of Applied Artillery at Vendas Novas. In 1911, with a reorganization of the Army, the range was put under the command of the Army's Arsenal (Portuguese: Arsenal do Exército) for testing equipment and ammunition manufactured or adapted by the Army's workshops and units. Two new ranges were then established. In 1912 the field firing range began to be used to test both national and foreign ammunition manufactured by Fábrica Militar de Braço de Prata, a weapons factory that at the time was part of the Army's Arsenal. In 1933, Fábrica Militar de Braço de Prata took control and command of the field firing range and expanded its infrastructure.

During World War II, as part of the Barron Plan (Portuguese: Plano Barron), the range was mainly used for storing anti-aircraft ammunition and artillery to aid in the aerial defense of the capital (Lisbon) and nearby military installations. This led to the range being transferred to the command of the Artillery Arm Directorate, integrated in the 1st Air Defense Group of Lisbon, and most of the complex's installations being abandoned after the end of the war.

In 1954, the range was assigned to the State Aeronautics Sub-secretary, which oversaw the then newly formed Portuguese Air Force, and its firing ranges were only used for air-to-ground combat training. This use of the area led to the construction of new bombing ranges with targets for air-to-ground machine gun, bombing and rocket fire, as well three control and observation towers, warehouses, ammunition depots and an airstrip. At the end of 1955, a new reorganization of the Armed Forces assigned the range to the command of the National Defense General-Secretary while the administration was assigned to the Ministry of the Army. The unit was reassigned to provide support in the training of pilots and air crews in live fire and bombing, as well in the study and testing of ammunition, explosives and gunpowder. At this time the Fábrica de Braço de Prata had signed a contract to supply the United States Army with artillery ordnance. As such, new facilities were built at the Alcochete field to allow the testing of projectiles.

With the beginning of the Ultramar War, Alcochete was equipped with five long-range radio antennas that allowed communications between the continent and the Portuguese military forces stationed in Angola, Guinea, Mozambique and Timor.

In 1970, West Germany's Air Force was given temporary and transitional access to the field firing ranges at Alcochete as part of an agreement in which it maintained a training facility in Portugal, due to airspace limitations for military training in its country. In 1980, as part of a new agreement between the two countries, activity on the range was divided between Portuguese and West German units, which gave more access and dedicated areas to German training units in exchange for West Germany financing further development of the infrastructure in the area.

The range received new equipment and upgraded existing facilities for ballistics testing and started negotiations to expand its area in 1980. With the dismantling of the Portuguese ammunition and weapons manufacturing industry in the 1990s, all equipment and facilities connected to this sector were removed and the focus of the area changed to only serve as a firing and bombing range and for military maneuvers.

On February 26, 1993, the range was integrated into the Air Force, under the control of the Air Command (COFA). The designation was changed from Campo de Tiro de Alcochete (CTA) to Campo de Tiro on September 15, 2010.

In 2007, the 81st Fighter Squadron made use of the air-to-ground firing ranges while deployed to Monte Real Air Base.

== Current users ==
The field firing range is currently used by all branches of the Portuguese Armed Forces for military maneuvers involving units preparing for deployment, evaluation of new equipment, large scale military exercises and Explosive Ordnance Disposal (EOD) training.

In addition to the Air Force units undergoing training and live ammunition exercises, the field firing range is also used by 552 Squadron for helicopter gun-mounted machine gun and cannon live fire training; 201 and 301 Squadron also use it for both air-to-air and air-to-ground training. This involves the firing of Mk-82, Mk-84, GBU-12 Paveway, GBU-49, GBU-31, GBU-33 and Mk-106 ordnance. In addition, the range has an all-terrain track certified by the National Firefighter School (Portuguese: Escola Nacional de Bombeiros) which is used for training by the Air Force's rescue and firefighting units.

The Portuguese Army makes further use of the complex for mortar and artillery training and MILAN anti-tank missile instruction courses. Airborne units make use of the area for parachute jumps due to the field's proximity to the Montijo Air Base, where the Air Force's C-295 and C-130 transport aircraft are based.

The Portuguese Navy's Marine Corps use the field's firing range for small arms and heavy weapons fire training.

The National Republican Guard's Companhia de Operações Especiais and subunits of the Infantry Regiment make use of the range for small arms fire, EOD and tactical training. The Grupo de Operações Especiais and Corpo de Intervenção, of the Polícia de Segurança Pública (PSP), use the range for anti-riot training. The PSP's Setúbal District Command also makes use of the area's firing range for civilian firearms carry license courses.

== See also ==
- Firing range
- Bombing range
- Proving ground
- Portuguese Armed Forces
- Portuguese Air Force
- New Lisbon Airport
- 201 Squadron
- 301 Squadron
- Real Thaw
- Portugal in World War II
- INDEP
- United States Air Force
- German Air Force
