= 304 Squadron =

304 Squadron may refer to:

- 304th Tactical Fighter Squadron (JASDF), Japan
- No. 304 Polish Bomber Squadron
- 304 Squadron (Portugal)
- 304th Expeditionary Airlift Squadron, United States
- 304th Rescue Squadron, United States
- 304th Transport Squadron, later 304th Special Operations Squadron, United States
- Bavarian Squadron 304, Royal Air Force
