= List of LTV A-7 Corsair II operators =

The following is a list of operators of the LTV A-7 Corsair II attack aircraft.

== Operators ==
=== Greece ===
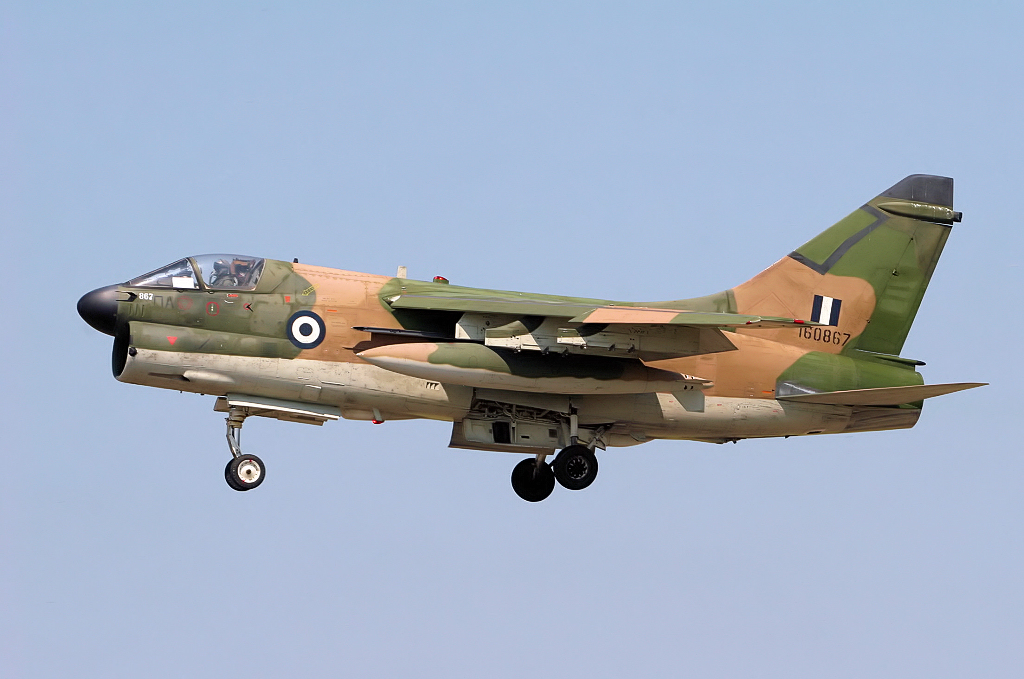
A-7C Corsair II of the Hellenic Air Force, over RIAT in 2006

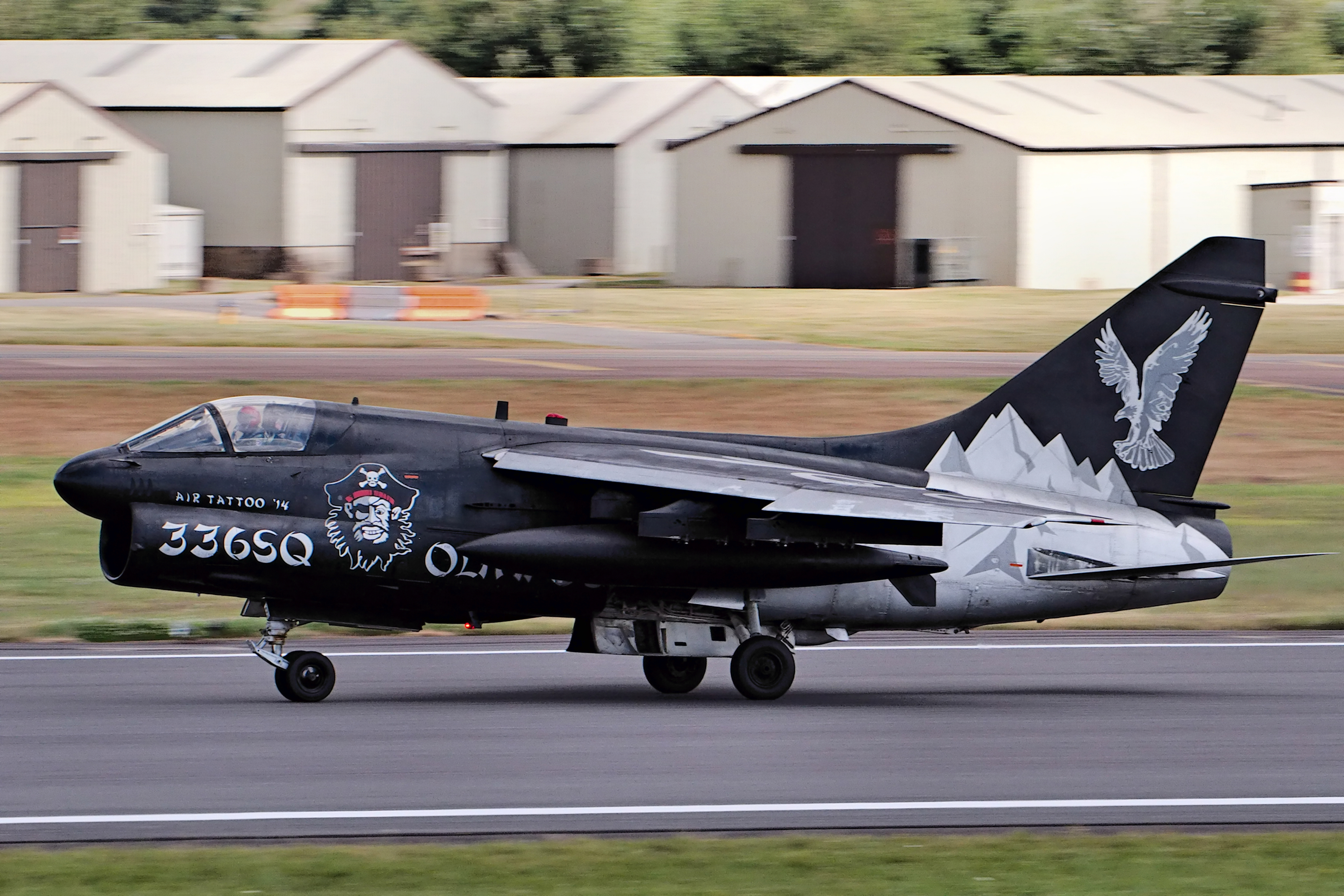
A-7 Corsair II of 336 Squadron in the special livery for the type's decommissioning, RIAT 2014

The Hellenic Air Force acquired 60 A-7Hs and five TA-7Hs from LTV between 1975-1980 and then 50 A-7Es and 18 TA-7Cs from the US Navy's inventory in 1993–1994.

Greece operated the Corsair IIs, in the form of the A-7E and TA-7C variants, and used these aircraft in the traditional tactical strike and ground attack roles for which it was designed. Greek A-7s were upgraded with many improvements, such as greater thrust from their Allison TF41 engines, upgraded avionics, radar, and full day/night capabilities. All Greek A-7s were programmed to be retired on October 17, 2014.

Hellenic Air Force (Elliniki Polemiki Aeroporia)

- 110th Combat Wing, Larissa Air Base
  - 345th Bomber Squadron, with A-7H (1976–2002)
  - 347th Bomber Squadron, with A-7H (1977–1992)
- 115th Combat Wing, Souda Air Base
  - 340th Bomber Squadron, with A-7H (1975–2001)
- 116th Combat Wing, Araxos Air Base
  - 335th Bomber Squadron, with A-7E (1993–2008)
  - 336th Bomber Squadron, with A-7E (1993–2014)

=== Portugal ===
Portugal's A-7s (designated A-7P, TA-7P) were 20 converted ex-United States Navy (USN) A-7A airframes powered by the Pratt & Whitney TF30-P408 engine and were equipped with A-7D and A-7E avionics. These aircraft were purchased through the V-519 contract of May 5, 1980, and initially 28 A-7A airframes were to be converted to the A-7P standard, but only the best 20 airframes were approved for the conversion. Deliveries to Portugal against this contract began on December 24, 1981, with the arrival of the first nine aircraft, and were completed by September 29, 1982.

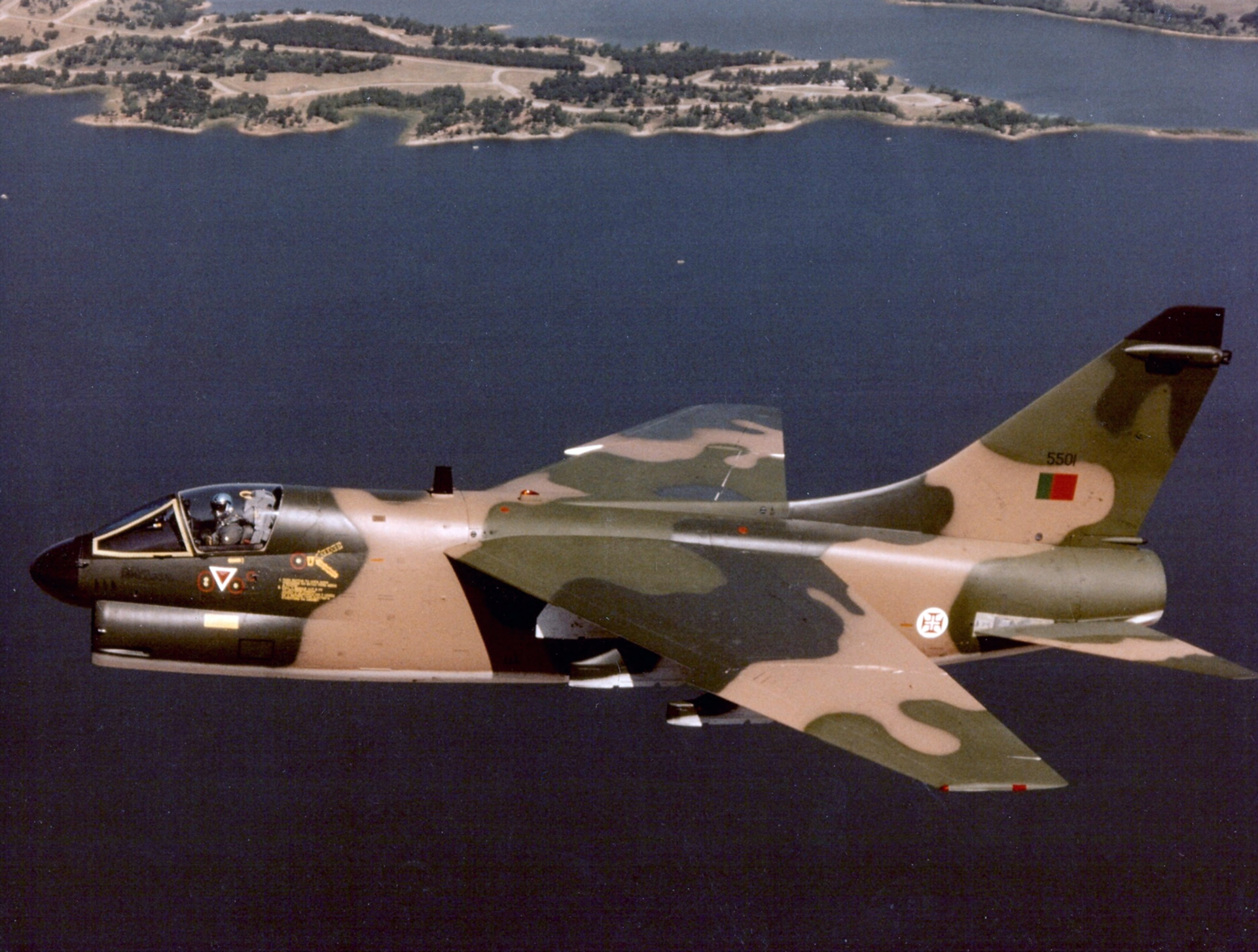
A Portuguese A-7P, in 1984.

In May, 1983, Portugal renegotiated the contract and placed an order for an additional 24 A-7Ps and six A-7As converted to two-seaters as TA-7P standard. Delivery of the aircraft of this second order took place between October 8, 1984, and April 30, 1986. However, one A-7P (PoAF s/n 15540) of the 24 ordered was lost in an accident in the United States prior to its delivery.

As part of the second order, the United States Navy leased one TA-7C (s/n 154404; c/n B-044) to Portugal between April 1982 and June 1985 for operational conversion of fighter pilots. This aircraft, a A-7B-1-CV Corsair II converted to TA-7C tandem-seat trainer, was nicknamed "Pomba Branca" (white dove) due to the original USN white paint that was kept. It was later returned to the United States Navy.

On June 10, 1999, the last operational Corsair II conducted the last flight of the aircraft fleet in service with the PoAF, with 64,000 logged flight hours.

Portuguese Air Force (Força Aérea Portuguesa)

- Attack Squadron 302 "Águias Reais" based at Air Base No. 5, in Monte Real, between 1981 and 1996.
- Attack Squadron 304 "Magníficos" based at Air Base No. 5, in Monte Real, between 1984 and 1999.

=== Thailand ===
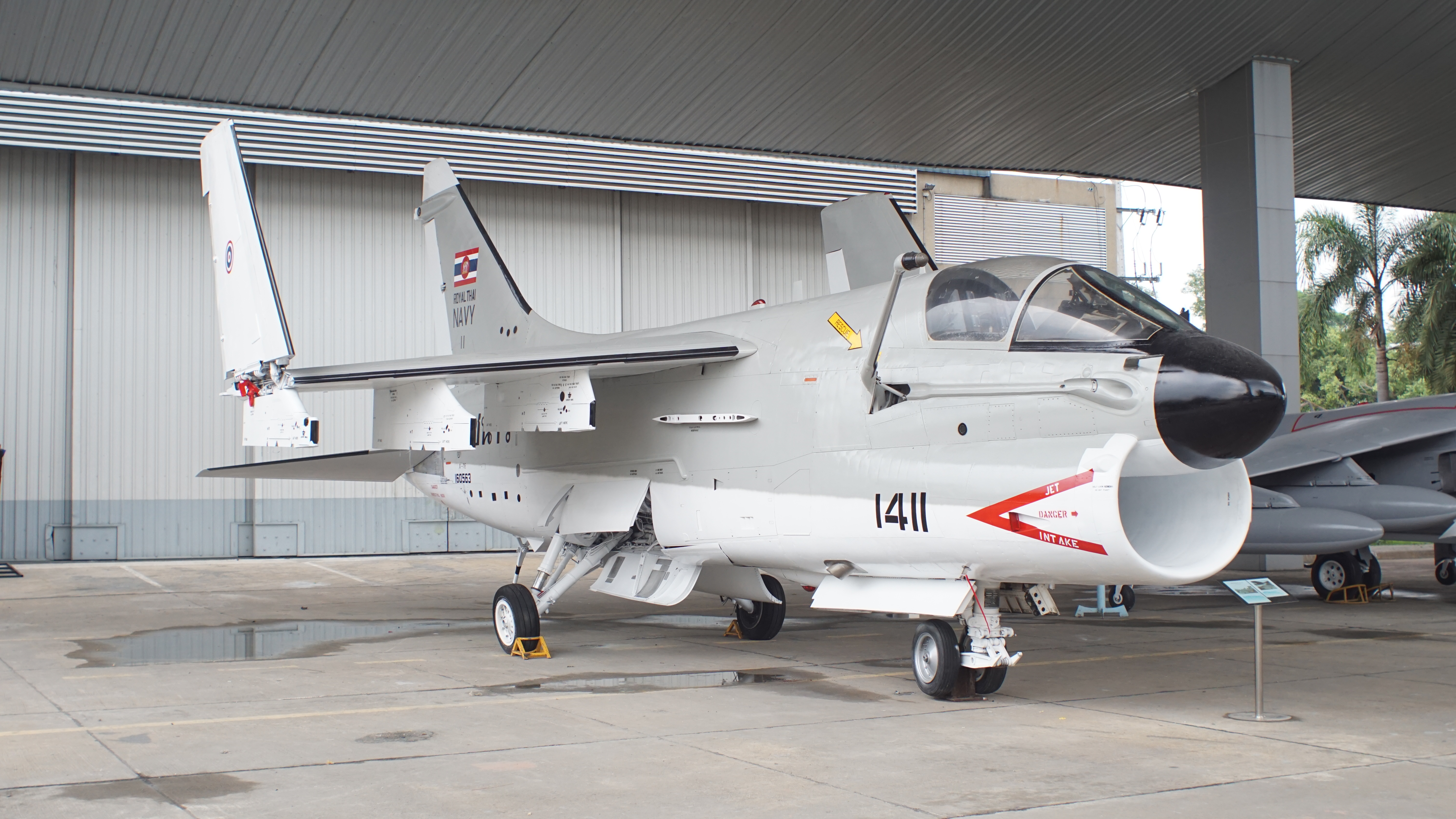
A Retired A-7E of the Royal Thai Navy in the Royal Thai Air Force Museum

Thailand purchased 14 A-7Es and 4 TA-7Cs for coastal defense and sea patrol duties. The aircraft were delivered during the summer of 1995 and were in service with the 104th "White Shark" squadron, 1st Wing at U-Tapao Air Base. These aircraft were not operational as of July 20, 2007. However, the Royal Thai Navy continues to maintain the operability of the aircraft with the necessary maintenance and by starting them up and taxiing them on the airport's tarmac.

Royal Thai Naval Air Division (Ratchanavee Thai or Kong Tup Rua Thai)

- 104th "White Shark" squadron, 1st Wing, U-Tapao Air Base; operated A-7E and TA-7C aircraft.

=== United States ===
==== United States Air Force ====
In response to the Army's need for a ground attack aircraft in South Vietnam, the Vought A-7 seemed to be a relatively quick and inexpensive way to satisfy this need. The USAF version of the aircraft was designated A-7D, and was customized with a different engine, a new avionics package, and an M61 rotary cannon, and a computerized navigation/weapons delivery system.

===== Support Commands =====
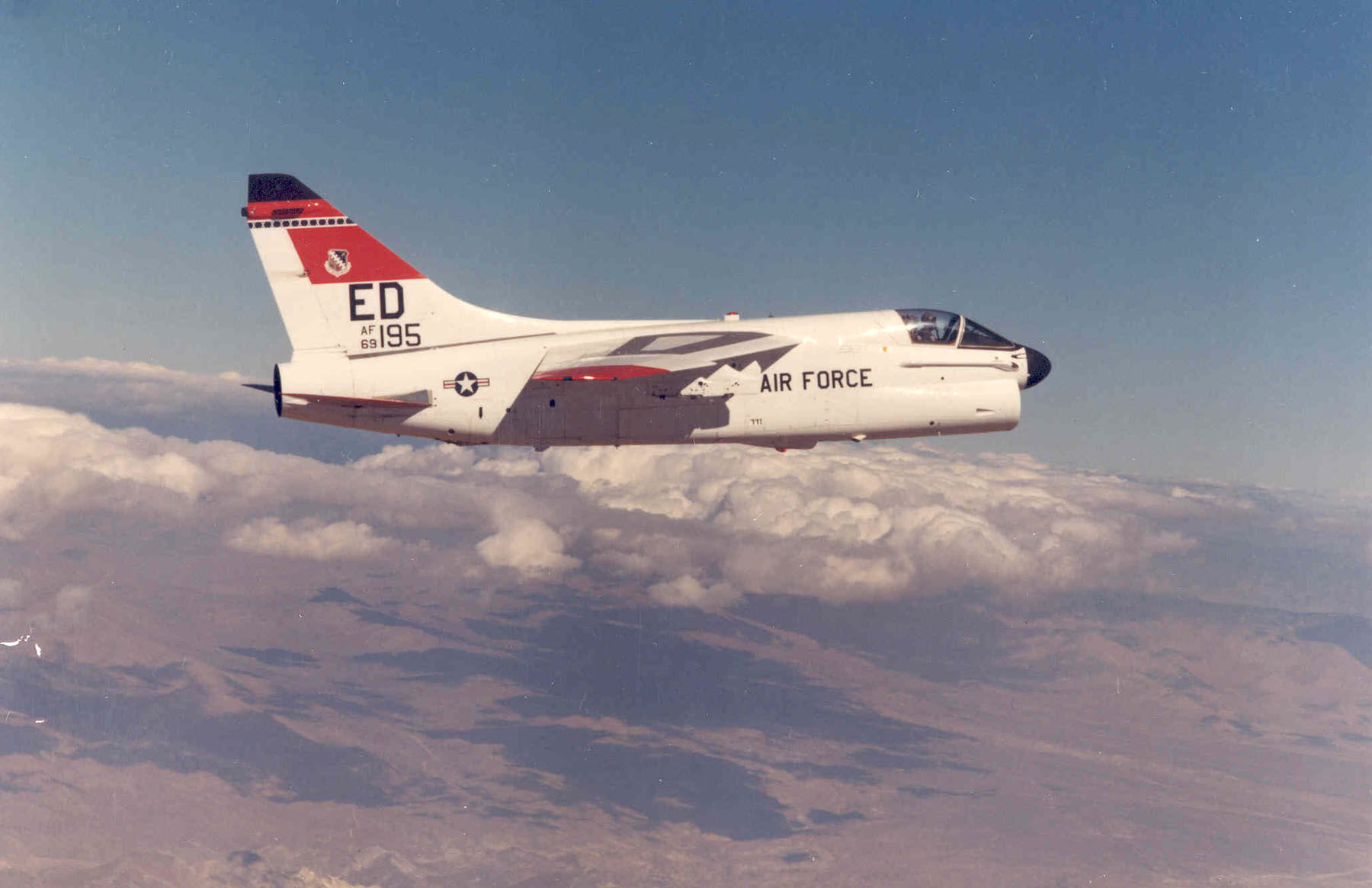
A-7D-3-CV 69-6195 assigned to the USAF Test Pilot School at Edwards.

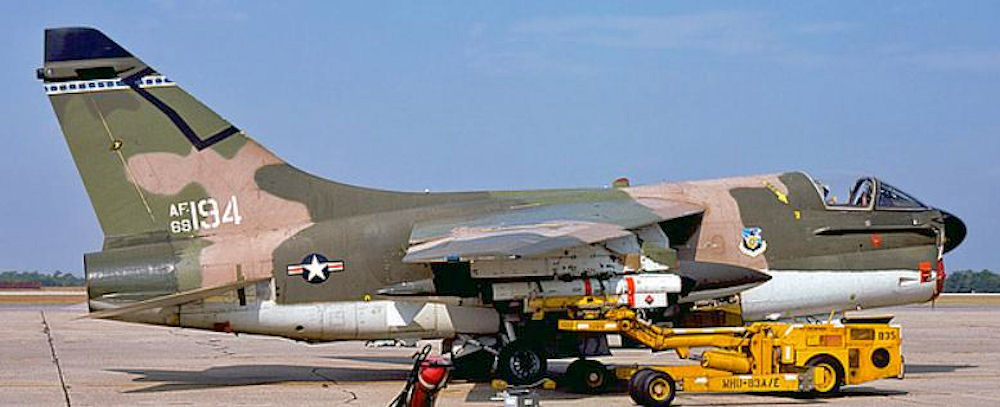
A-7D 68-8224 of the 3246th Test Wing, Eglin AFB, FL prior to a weapons test flight

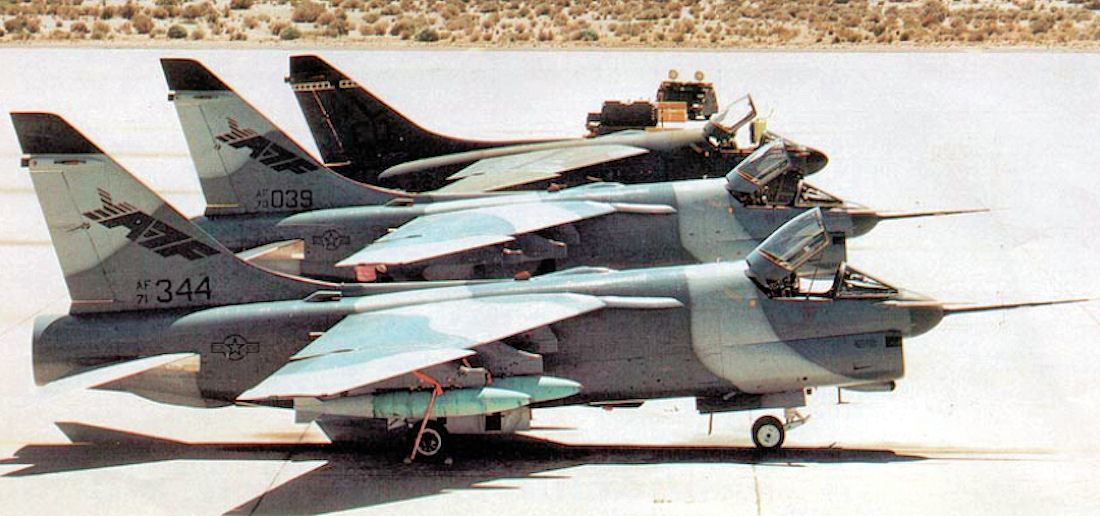
Both 445th Flight Test Squadron YA-7F Corsair IIs prototypes with Edwards-based A-7D 69–6217 in 1990

The first YA-7D and some early production A-7D aircraft were received from LTV by Air Force Systems Command at Edwards AFB, California (Tail code: ED) and Eglin AFB, Florida (EG) in early 1968. Edwards aircraft were used for the initial Flight Testing (FT) of the new aircraft, and were later retained for ongoing flight testing of aircraft modifications over its years in operational service. An A-7D was also used at the USAF Test Pilot School. In 1979, the prototype A-7K two-seat trainer was tested at Edwards, and in 1988, the YA-7F Strike fighter was also tested there. Edlin Aircraft were used for Operational Testing (OT) and weapons tests of ordnance.

Tinker AFB, Oklahoma (FLZ) was designated the prime depot support facility for the A-7D. All newly manufactured aircraft were delivered there from LTV for acceptance inspection by Air Force Logistics Command (AFLC) prior to delivery to operational units. Tinker also provided ongoing depot-level maintenance and IRAN inspections of operational aircraft until its retirement in 1992.

- 6510th Test Wing Edwards Air Force Base California

YA-7D-1-CV s/n 67-14582 (1968-1992) First Y-A7D flight 4/6/1968
YA-7D-1-CV s/n 67-14583 (1968-1992) First USAF Fly-By-Wire (DIGITAC) aircraft
A-7D-2-CV s/n 68-8221 (1968-1972) (crashed)
A-7D-2-CV s/n 68-8222 (1968-1992)
A-7D-2-CV s/n 68-8223 (1968-1978)
A-7D-3-CV s/n 69-6191 (1978-1991)
A-7D-3-CV s/n 69-6194 (1969-1990)
A-7D-5-CV s/n 69-6217 (1983-1992)

A-7D-15-CV s/n 73-1008 (1979-1982) Converted to A-7K Prototype
A-7D-11-CV s/n 71-0344 (1989-1990) Converted to YA-7F first prototype
A-7D-9-CV s/n 70-1039 (1989-1990) Converted to YA-7F second prototype

- 3246th Test Wing Eglin Air Force Base, Florida (AD).

YA-7D-1-CV s/n 67-14585 (1968-1973) (Eglin) Crashed
YA-7D-1-CV s/n 67-14586 (1968-1975) (Eglin)
A-7D-2-CV s/n 68-8224 (1968-1976) (Edwards/Eglin)

===== Operational use =====
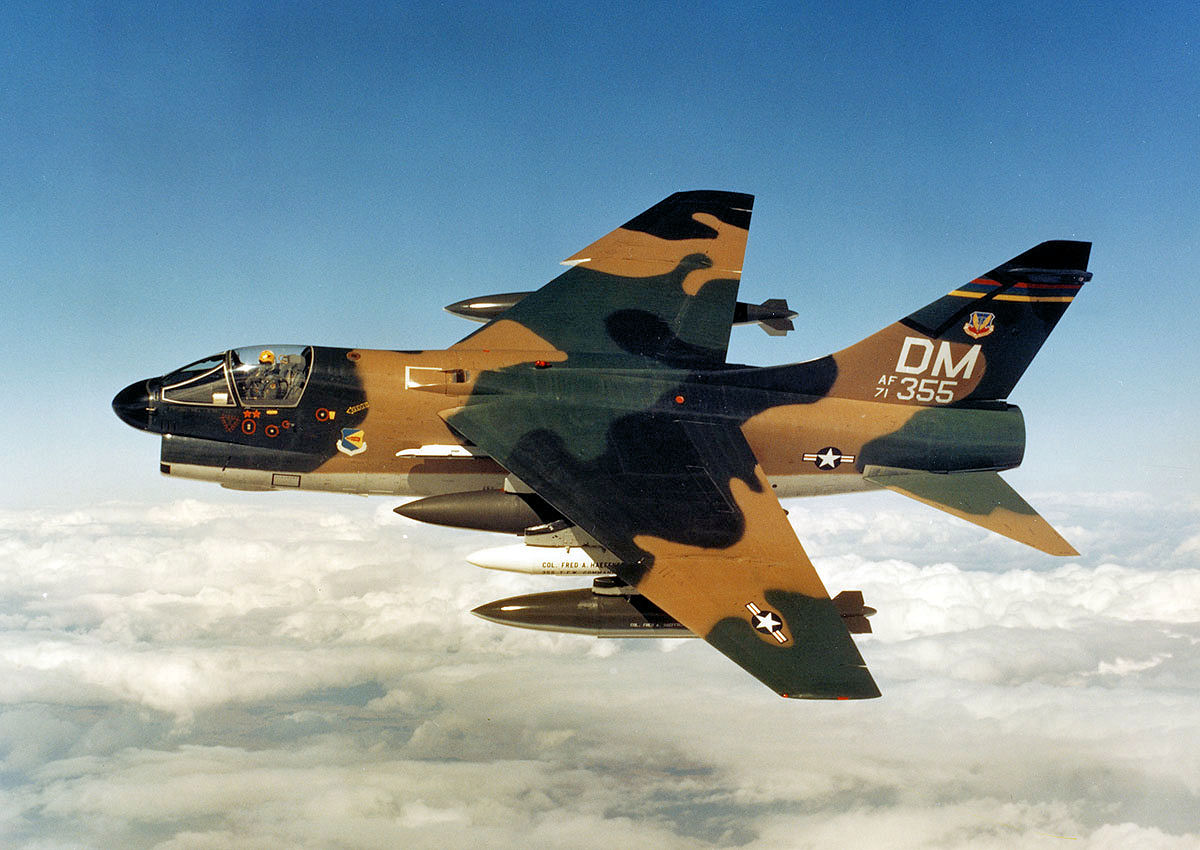
355th Tactical Fighter Wing A-7D

The first production A-7Ds were delivered to the Tactical Air Command USAF Tactical Fighter Weapons School at Nellis AFB, Nevada in September 1969 for advanced air combat evaluations. Approximately 12 aircraft were assigned to the 66th Fighter Weapons Squadron, 4525th Fighter Weapons Wing at any one time.

- 57th Fighter Weapons Wing, Nellis AFB, Nevada 1969–1981 (WA)

4525th FWW, Det. 1 - Received a/c 9/1969. Transferred a/c to 66th FWS 6/1972.
66th Fighter Weapons Squadron - Received a/c 6/72 from 4525th FWW - Transferred a/c to ANG 1981.
Aircraft used for advanced air combat evaluations.

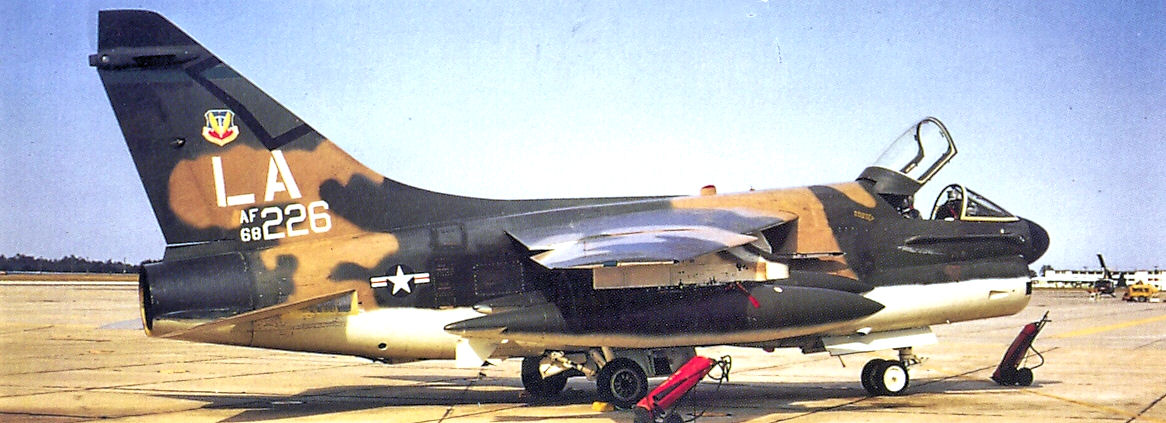
A-7D-3-CV 68–6226, 310th TFTS, Luke AFB, AZ, May 1971. Aircraft was converted to GA-7D ground Trainer after operational use ended. Sent To AMARC, 1992

Luke AFB, Arizona, was the second Tactical Air Command base to receive the aircraft. In 1969, the 310th Tactical Fighter Training Squadron, 58th Tactical Fighter Training Wing began Fighter Lead-In training for USAF pilots to transition to the A-7D. This training was conducted until July 1971, when the training was transferred to Davis-Monthan AFB, Arizona with the establishment of the 333d Tactical Fighter Training Squadron/355th TFW. Subsequently, all A-7D aircraft, personnel and support equipment was reassigned.

- 58th Tactical Fighter Training Wing Luke AFB Arizona 1969–1971 (LA)

310th Tactical Fighter Training Squadron - Received a/c 12/1969. Transferred a/c to 333d TFS/355th TFW 7/1971

The first operational aircraft for TAC were received at Myrtle Beach AFB, South Carolina (MB) and Davis-Monthan AFB, Arizona (DM) in 1971, becoming operational in 1972. England AFB, Louisiana (EL) was equipped in 1972 and made operational in 1973.

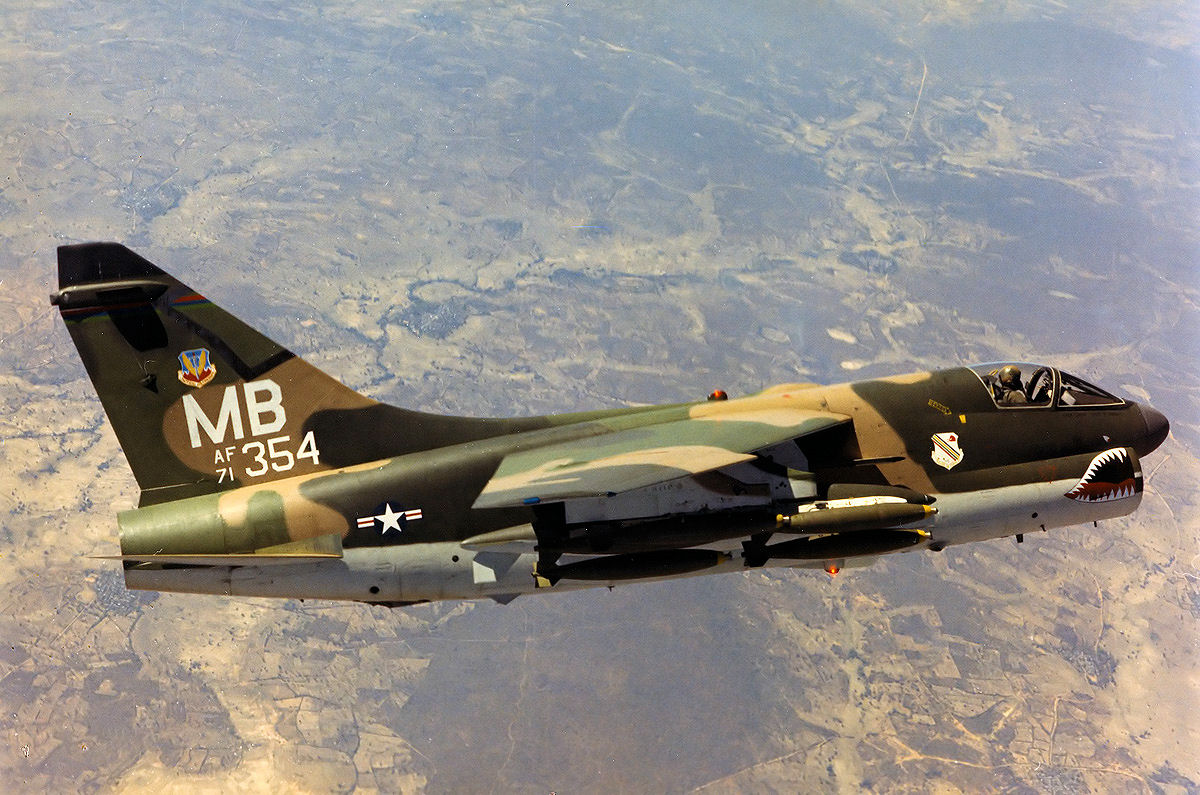
Myrtle Beach A-7D 71-0354 was the Wing Commander's aircraft

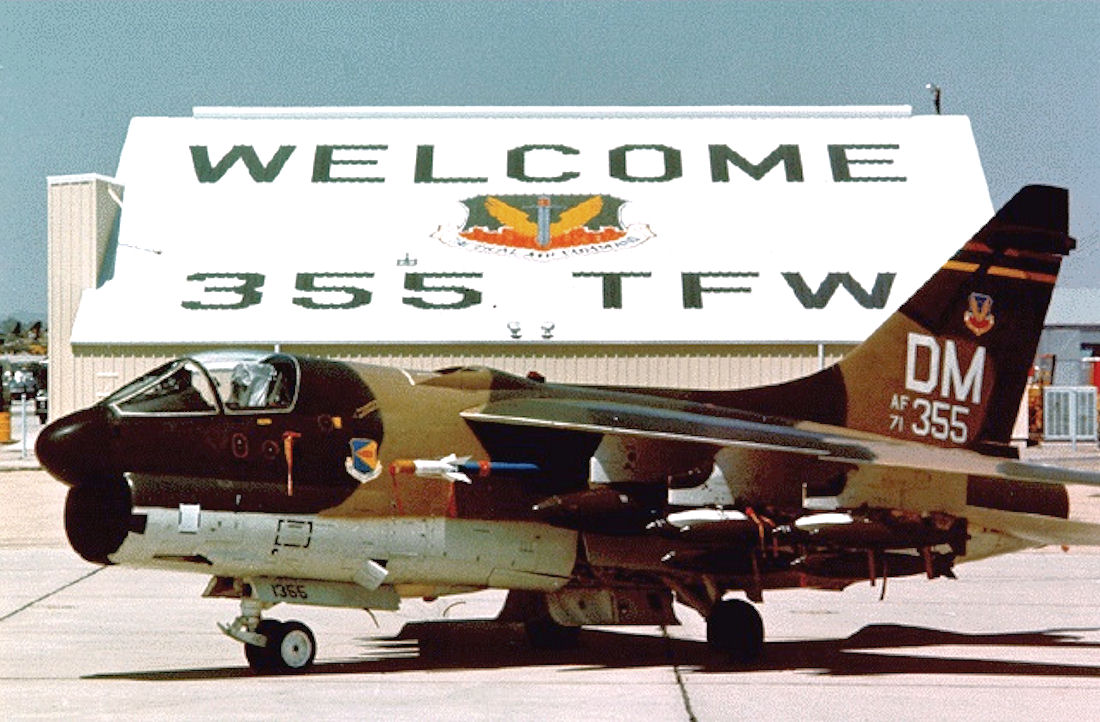
71-355, Wing Commander's aircraft of the 355th Tactial Fighter Wing

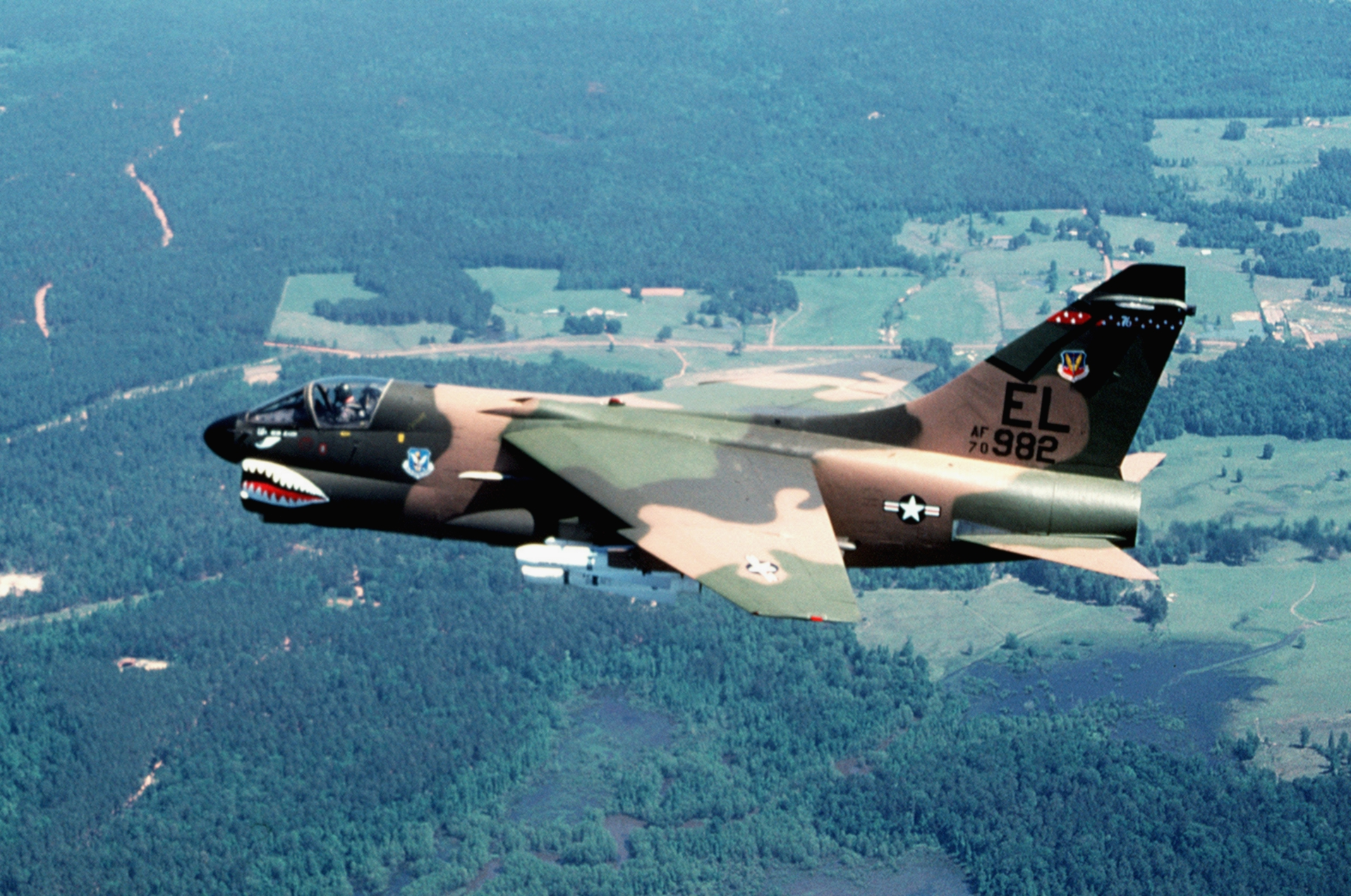
England AFB 76th TFS 70-0982 shown in Bicentennial Motif in 1976

- 354th Tactical Fighter Wing, Myrtle Beach Air Force Base, South Carolina 1970–1978 (MB)***

353d Tactical Fighter Squadron (MR/MB) - Received a/c 7/1971 from inactivated 511th TFS. Additional a/c received during 1973/1974 after deployed assets transferred to 3d TFS/388th TFW. Transferred a/c to ANG 1976
355th Tactical Fighter Squadron (MB) - Received a/c 12/1970. Transferred a/c to ANG 1977
356th Tactical Fighter Squadron (MN/MB) - Received a/c 5/1971. Transferred a/c to ANG 1977.
511th Tactical Fighter Squadron (MR) - Received a/c 6/1970. Transferred a/c to 353d TFS 7/1971 and inactivated.
4554th Tactical Fighter Replacement Squadron (MB) - Received a/c 5/1972. Transferred a/c to ANG 1974/75.

- 355th Tactical Fighter Wing, Davis-Monthan Air Force Base, Arizona 1971–1979 (DM)***

333d Tactical Fighter Training Squadron (DM) - Transferred from 310 TFTS/58th TFTW 7/1971. - Transferred a/c to ANG 1976.
354th Tactical Fighter Squadron (DA/DM) - Received a/c 7/1971. Transferred a/c to ANG 1979.
357th Tactical Fighter Squadron (DC/DM) - Received a/c 5/1971. Transferred a/c to ANG 1976.
358th Tactical Fighter Squadron (DD/DM) - Received a/c 10/1971. Transferred a/c to ANG 1978.

- 23d Tactical Fighter Wing, England Air Force Base Louisiana 1972–1981 (EL)

74th Tactical Fighter Squadron - Received a/c 7/1972. Transferred a/c to ANG 1981.
75th Tactical Fighter Squadron - Received a/c 7/1972. Transferred a/c to ANG 1981.
76th Tactical Fighter Squadron - Received a/c 10/1972. Transferred a/c to ANG 1981.

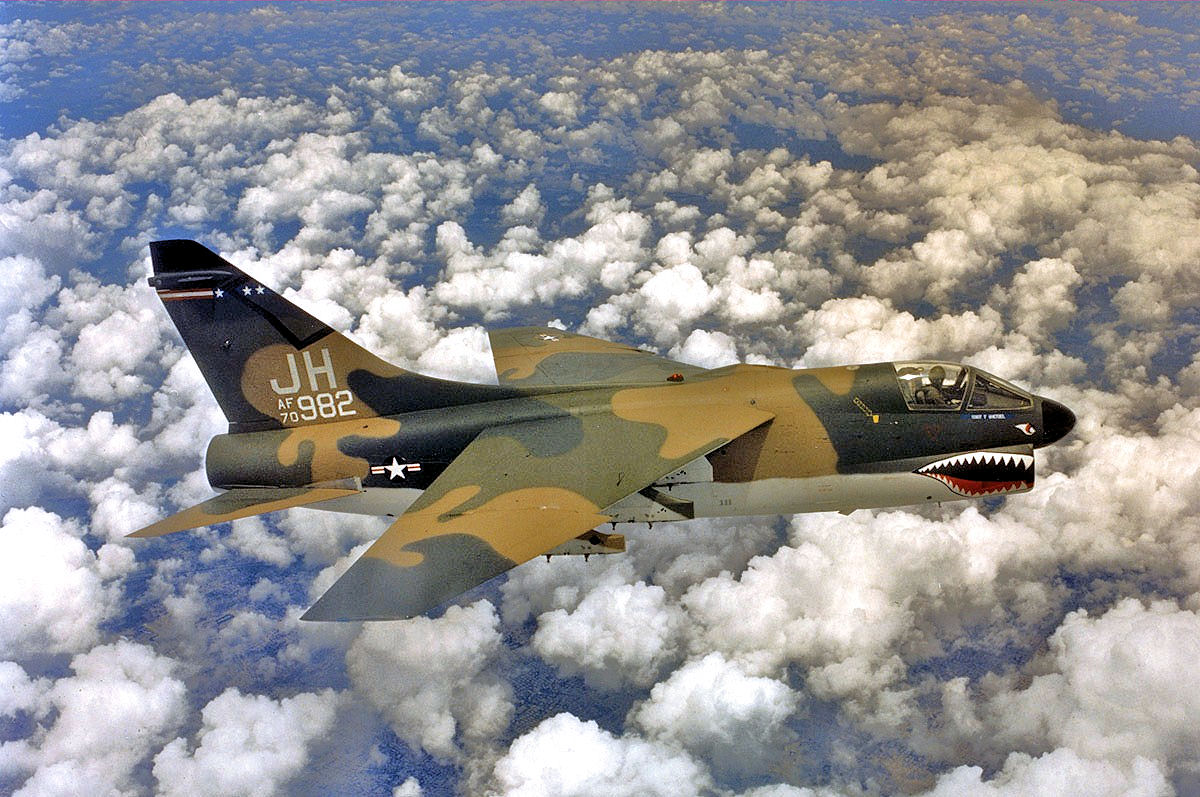
3d Tactical Fighter Squadron A-7D 70–0982 in flight

A-7D Corsair II aircraft arrived at Korat Royal Thai Air Force Base, Thailand in October 1972 during the Vietnam War. The aircraft were deployed primarily from the 353d and 356th Tactical Fighter Squadrons, 354th Tactical Fighter Wing at Myrtle Beach AFB, South Carolina. Pacific Air Forces (PACAF) activated the 3d Tactical Fighter Squadron/388th TFW at Korat and most of the Myrtle Beach A-7Ds were transferred to the new permanent squadron. 3d TFS aircraft were tail-coded "JH". This was the only A-7D unit assigned outside of the United States on a permanent basis.

- 388th Tactical Fighter Wing, Korat Royal Thai Air Force Base, Thailand 1973–1975 (JH)

3d Tactical Fighter Squadron - Received a/c 3/1973 from deployed 353d TFS/354th TFW. Transferred a/c to ANG 1975.

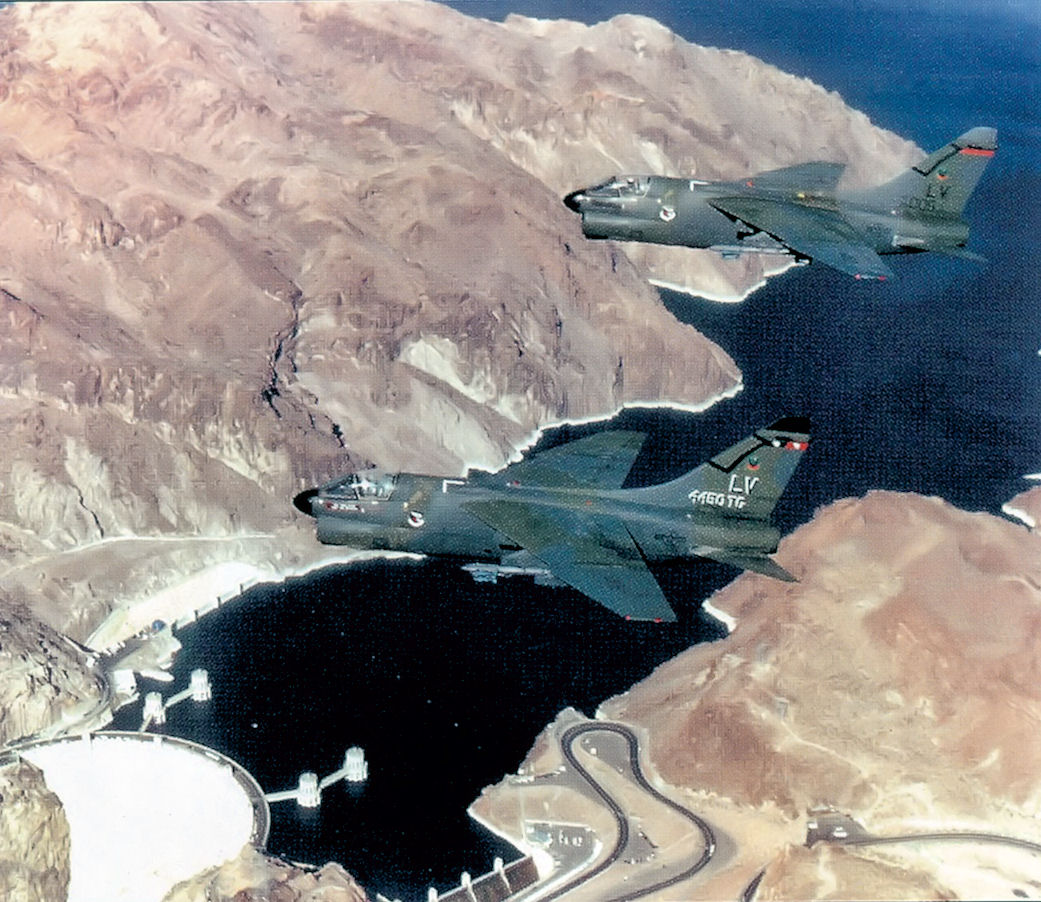
4451st Tactical Squadron A-7D Corsair IIs over Hoover Dam

Beginning in 1979, A-7Ds and A-7K trainers were used by the 4451st Tactical Squadron, 4450th Tactical Group at Nellis AFB. Although assigned to Nellis AFB, the aircraft operated from Tonopah Test Range Airport, Nevada (LV) as part of the F-117A Stealth Fighter program. In 1989, the aircraft were transferred to the Air National Guard when the F-117A became operational.

The 4451st TS was the last USAF active-duty A-7D Corsair II squadron.

- 4450th Tactical Group, Nellis Air Force Base, Nevada 1981–1989 (LV) **

4451st Tactical Squadron (Formerly 4450TG (P) Unit) - Received eight A-7Ds from retiring 23d TFW a/c 6/1981, and two A-7K a/c (73-1008, 79-0469) in late 1981. Transferred a/c to ANG 1989.

Note:*** Prior to June 1972, Squadron Tail Codes were used on Myrtle Beach and Davis-Monthan aircraft. These were standardized to MB for 354th TFW and DM for 355th TFW IAW AFM 66–1 in June 1972.

==== United States Air National Guard ====
With the end of the Vietnam War, Air National Guard (ANG) units began receiving active-duty A-7D aircraft in 1974, beginning with the Colorado, New Mexico and Ohio ANG. South Carolina and Puerto Rico received aircraft in 1975. New production aircraft (1974, 1975 serial numbers) began to be received by ANG units in 1975. As Fairchild Republic A-10 Thunderbolt II aircraft were received by Tactical Air Command, additional A-7Ds were transferred to Iowa and South Dakota in 1977, along with Arizona and Michigan in 1978. The last Air National Guard squadrons equipped were units of the Pennsylvania ANG in 1980; and of the Oklahoma and Virginia ANGs in 1981.

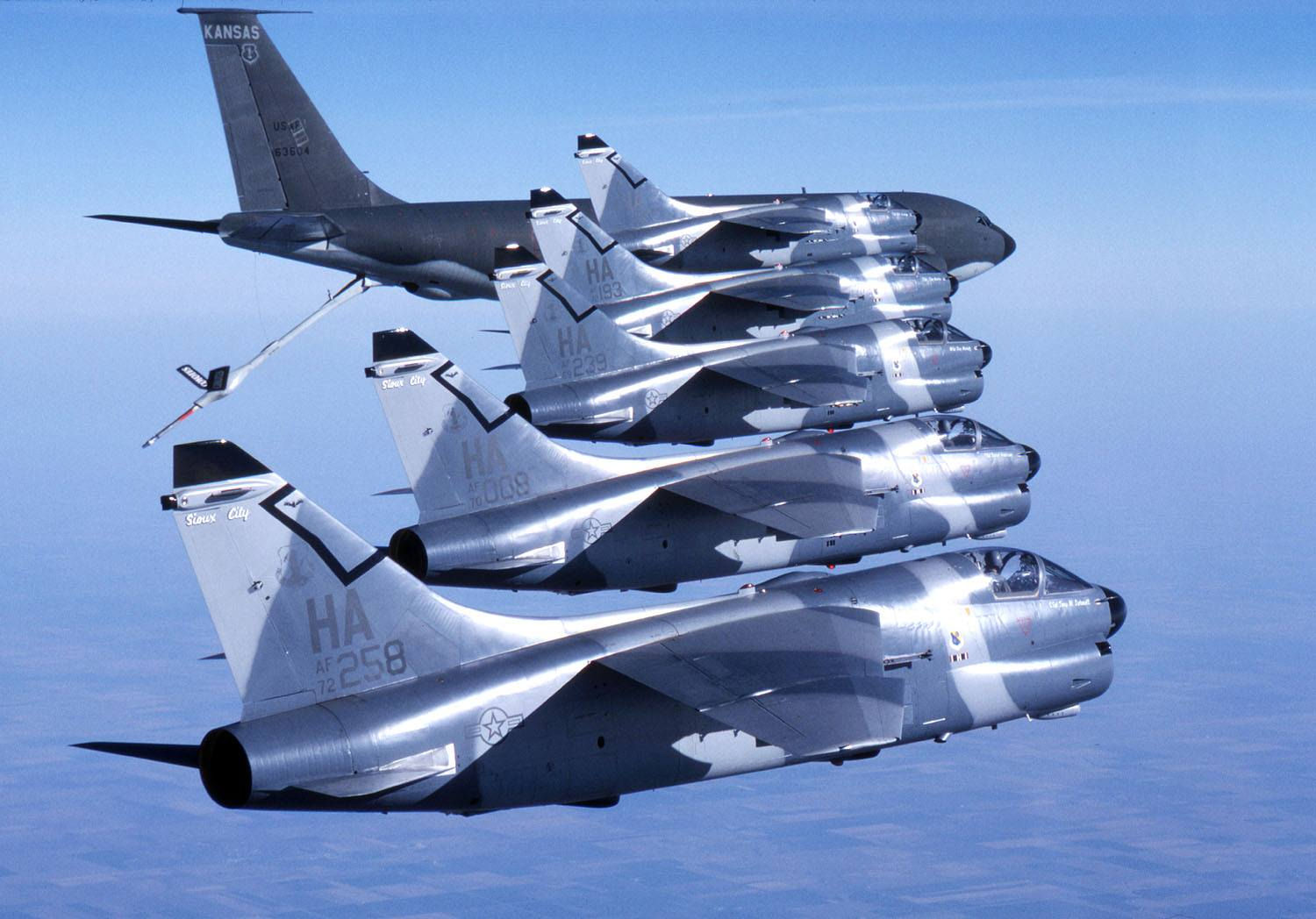
Iowa ANG 124th Tactical Fighter Squadron A-7D Corsair IIs in formation with SAC KC-135

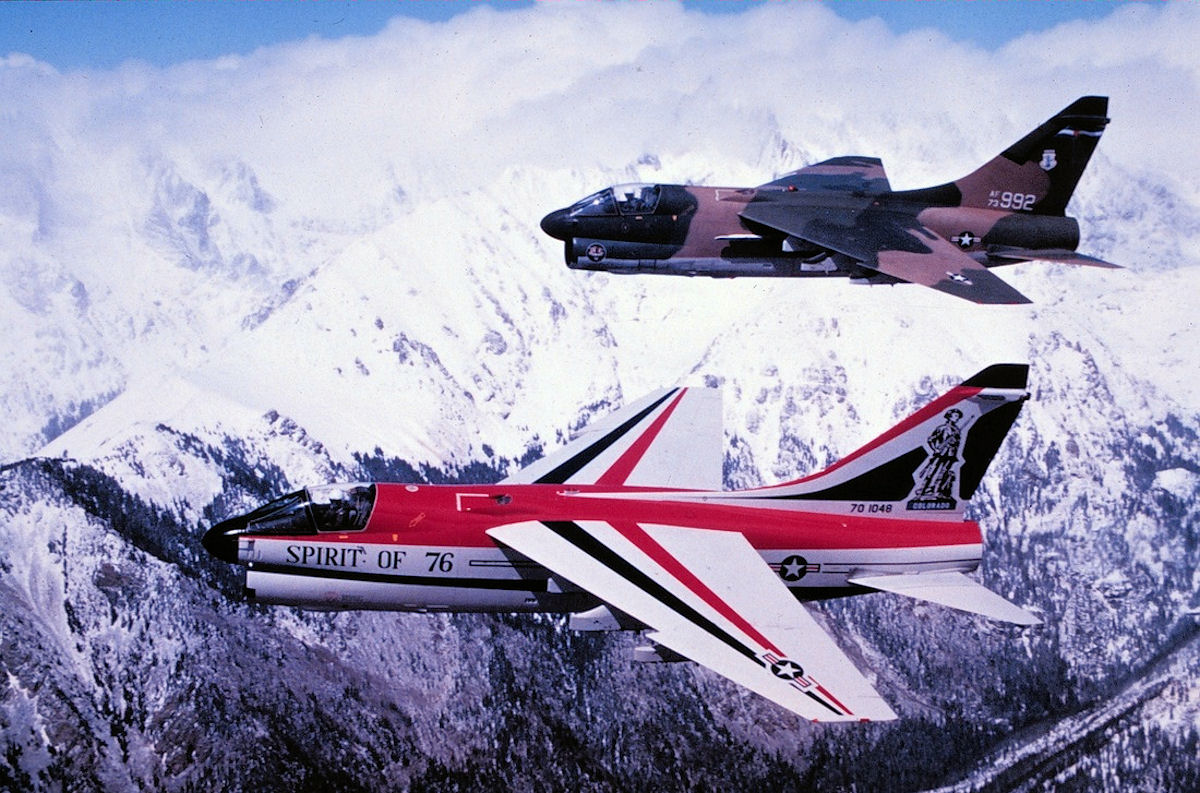
New Mexico and Colorado Air National Guard A-7D Corsair IIs flying over the Rocky Mountains in Bicentennial Motif, 1976

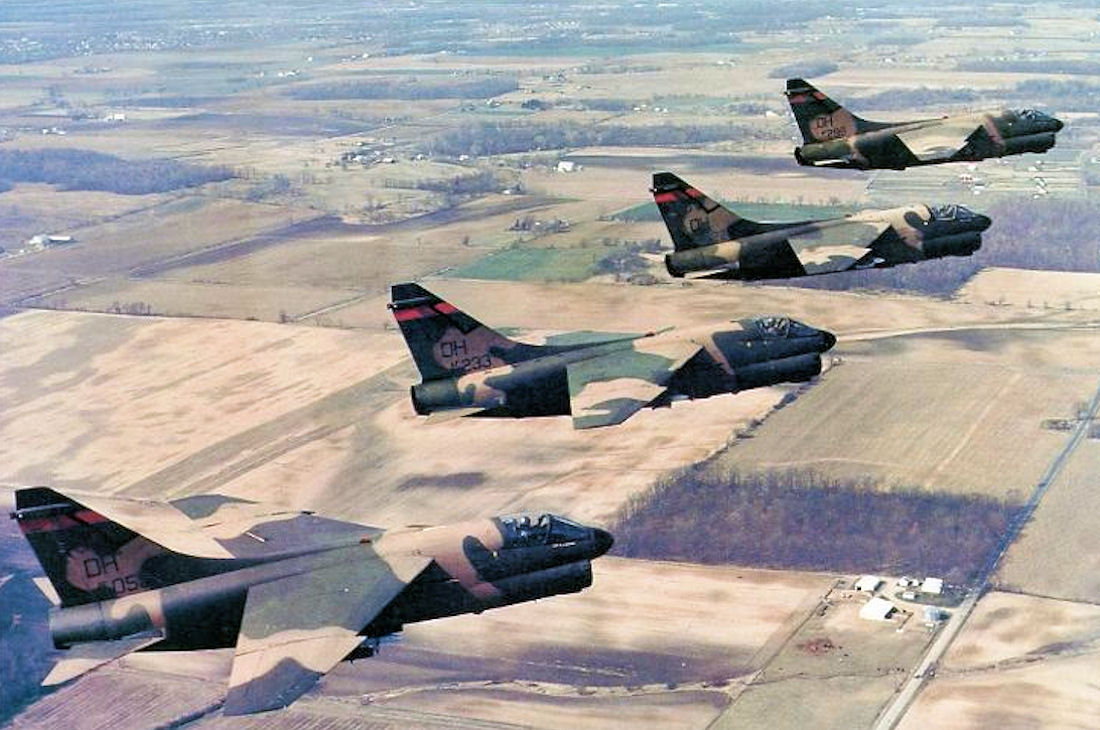
Ohio ANG 162d Tactical Fighter Squadron A-7D Corsair II Formation

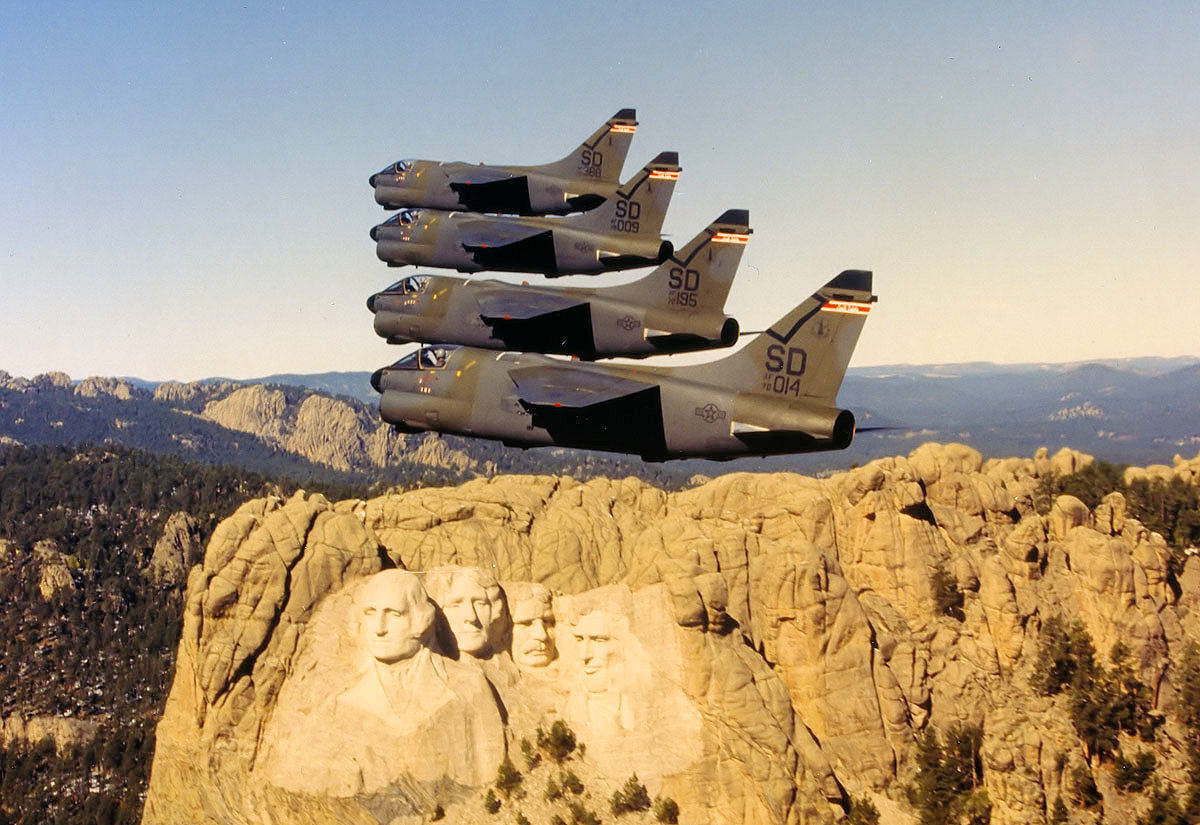
South Dakota 175th Tactical Fighter Squadron A-7D Corsair IIs fly past Mount Rushmore

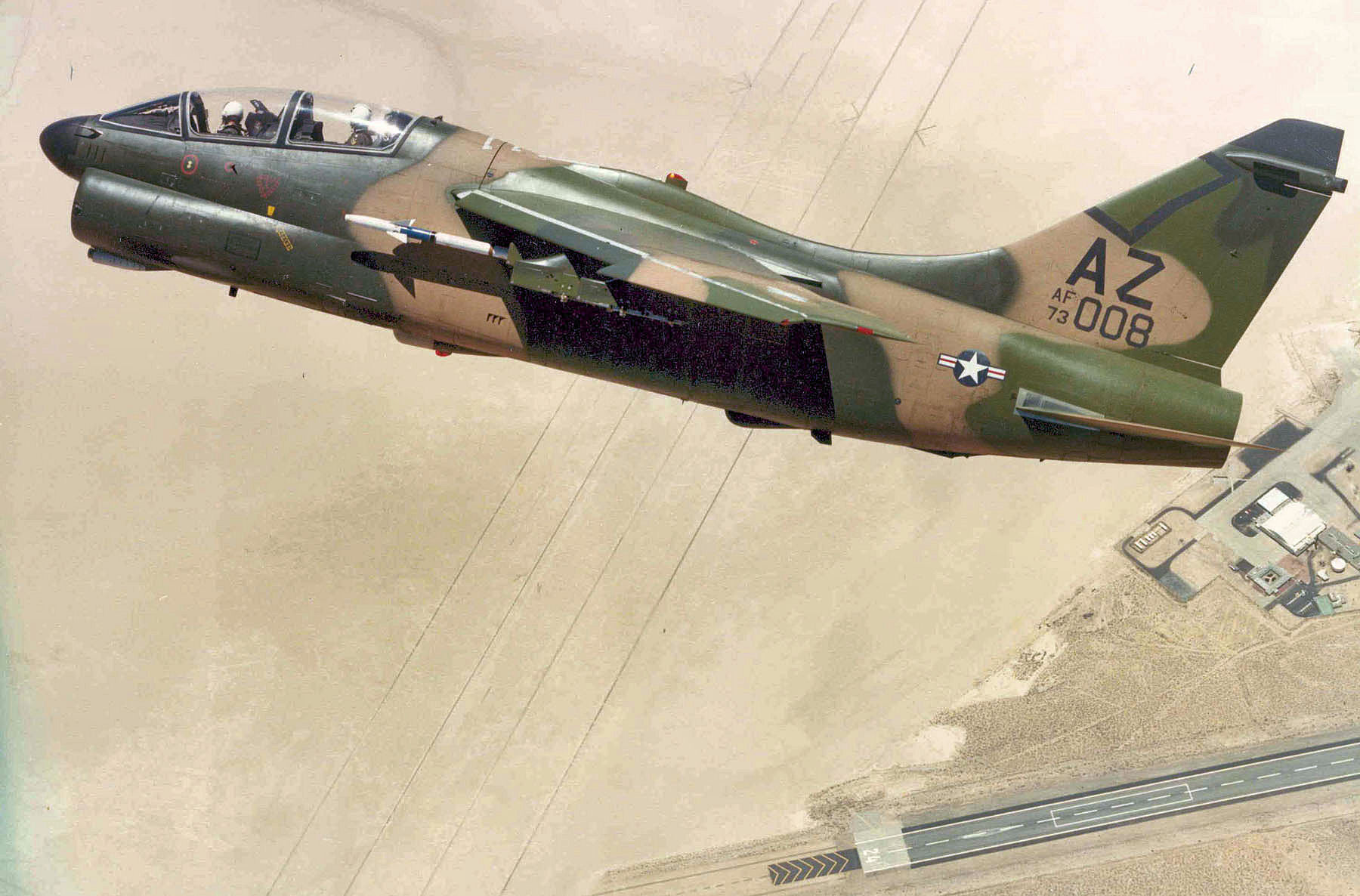
A-7D-15-CV 73-1008 modified to YA-7K configuration. Shown with 152d TFS, Arizona Air National Guard, 1989. Formerly of the 4450th Tactical Group, Nellis/Tonapah Nevada during the 1980s. This aircraft was sent to AMARC on August 3, 1992.

The A-7K Corsair II was a two-seat trainer version of the A-7D for Air National Guard, The aircraft was a fully combat capable A-7D but with two seats in tandem. The first A-7Ks were delivered in 1982.

In the early 1990s, the A-7D was phased out of the ANG inventory, with the aircraft being sent to AMARC. In 1993 the last units to retire the A-7D were the ANG units at Rickenbacker ANGB (Ohio) in January, Des Moines (Iowa) in September, with the last unit being the 125th Tactical Fighter Squadron, Tulsa (Oklahoma) in October 1993.

- 112th Tactical Fighter Group Pennsylvania ANG (PT)

146th Tactical Fighter Squadron, Pittsburgh IAP Air Reserve Station, Pittsburgh
Received A-7D in 1980 and A-7K in 1983.
Re-designated as 146th Air Refueling Squadron with KC-135s on October 16, 1991.

- 114th Tactical Fighter Group South Dakota ANG (SD)

175th Tactical Fighter Squadron, Sioux Falls (Joe Foss Field Air National Guard Station)
Received A-7D in 1977 and A-7K in 1982.
Converted to Block 30 F-16C/Ds on March 16, 1992.

- 121st Tactical Fighter Wing Ohio ANG (OH)

162d Tactical Fighter Squadron, Springfield
Received A-7D in 1978 and A-7K in 1982.
Converted to Block 30 F-16C/Ds in May 1993.
112th Tactical Fighter Squadron, Toledo Air National Guard Base, Toledo
Received A-7D in 1979 and A-7K in 1980.
Converted to Block 25 F-16C/Ds in April 1992.
166th Tactical Fighter Squadron, Rickenbacker Air National Guard Base, Columbus
Received A-7D in 1974 and A-7K in 1983.
Re-designated as 166th Air Refueling Squadron and equipped with KC-135Rs on January 16, 1993.

- 127th Tactical Fighter Wing Michigan ANG (MI)

107th Tactical Fighter Squadron, Selfridge Air National Guard Base, Detroit
Received A-7D in 1978 and A-7K in 1983.
Converted to Block 10 F-16A/B on April 1, 1990.

- 132d Tactical Fighter Wing Iowa ANG (IA)

124th Tactical Fighter Squadron, Des Moines Air National Guard Base, Des Moines
Received A-7D in 1977 and A-7K in 1981.
Converted to Block 42 F-16C/Ds in September 1993.

- 185th Tactical Fighter Group (1976) (HA)

174th Tactical Fighter Squadron, Sioux City Air National Guard Base, Sioux City
Received A-7D in 1976 and A-7K in 1983.
Converted to F-16C/Ds on March 16, 1992

- 138th Tactical Fighter Group Oklahoma ANG (TL/OK)

125th Tactical Fighter Squadron, Tulsa Air National Guard Base, Tulsa
Received A-7D in 1981 and A-7K in 1983.
Converted to Block 42 F-16C/Ds in October 1993.

- 140th Tactical Fighter Wing Colorado ANG (CO)

120th Tactical Fighter Squadron, Buckley Air Force Base, Aurora
Received A-7D in 1974 and A-7K in 1983.
Converted to Block 30 F-16C/Ds on March 15, 1992

- 150th Tactical Fighter Wing, New Mexico Air National Guard (NM)

188th Tactical Fighter Squadron, Kirtland Air Force Base, Albuquerque
Received A-7D in 1974
Converted to Block 40 F-16C/Ds on 11 May 1992

- 156th Tactical Fighter Wing Puerto Rico ANG (PR)

198th Tactical Fighter Squadron, Muñiz Air National Guard Base, San Juan
Received A-7D in 1975 and A-7K in 1983.
Converted to Block 15 ADF (Air Defense) F-16A/Bs on March 16, 1992.

- 162d Tactical Fighter Group Arizona ANG (AZ)

152d Tactical Fighter Squadron, Tucson Air National Guard Base, Tucson
Received A-7D in 1978, A-7K in 1983.
Converted to Block 10/15 F-16A/Bs on May 29, 1986, upgraded to Block 42 F-16C/D in 1995.
195th Tactical Fighter Squadron, Tucson Air National Guard Base, Tucson
Received A-7D and A-7K in 1983.
Converted to Block 15 F-16A/Bs on March 16, 1992.

- 169th Tactical Fighter Group South Carolina ANG (SC)

157th Tactical Fighter Squadron, McEntire Joint National Guard Base, Columbia
Received A-7D in 1975 and A-7K in 1982.
Converted to F-16A/Bs in 1983.

- 192d Tactical Fighter Group Virginia ANG (VA)

149th Tactical Fighter Squadron, Richmond International Airport, Richmond
Received A-7D in 1981 and A-7K in 1982.
Converted to Block 30 F-16C/Ds on March 15, 1992.

==== United States Navy ====
In 1967 the A-7 Corsair II made its initial military service and combat debut with the United States Navy, which over time became its most prolific user. It was gradually phased out in the 1980s and replaced with the McDonnell Douglas F/A-18 Hornet. The US Navy retired its last Corsair IIs in May 1991.

Currently active-duty squadrons or units that were former A-7 operators

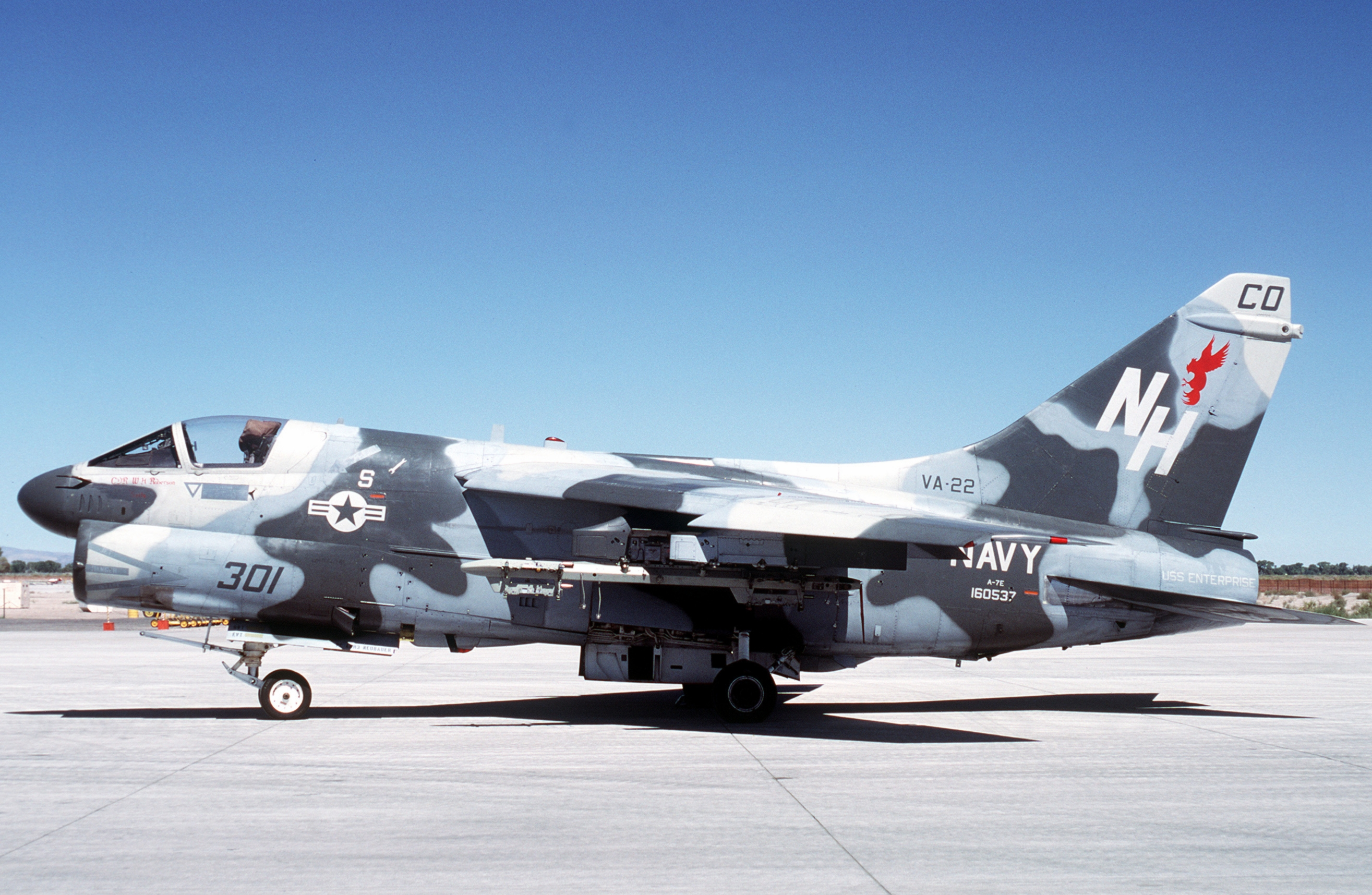
A-7E Corsair II (BuNo 160537) from attack squadron VA-22 Fighting Redcocks at the Naval Air Station Fallon, Nevada, 1987

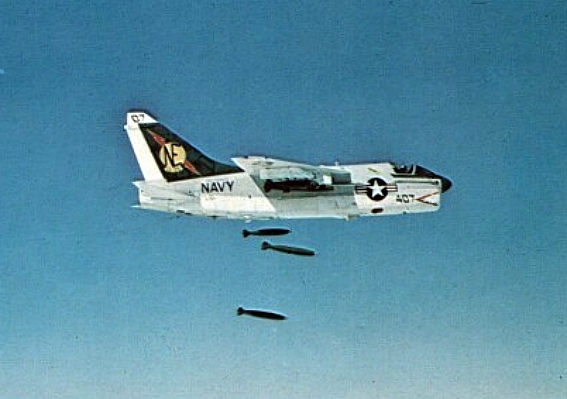
A VA-27 A-7E dropping bombs over Vietnam, 1970.

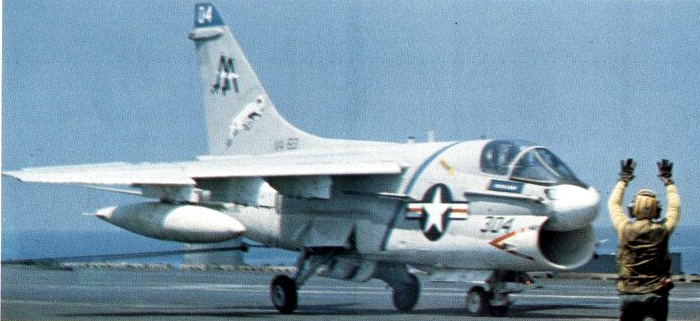
A-7E Corsair II of Attack Squadron VA-83 "Rampagers" landing aboard the aircraft carrier USS Forrestal (CV-59), 1981

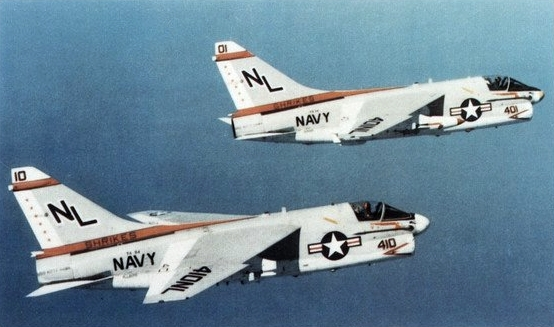
A-7E Corsair II from Attack Squadron VA-94 Shrikes in flight

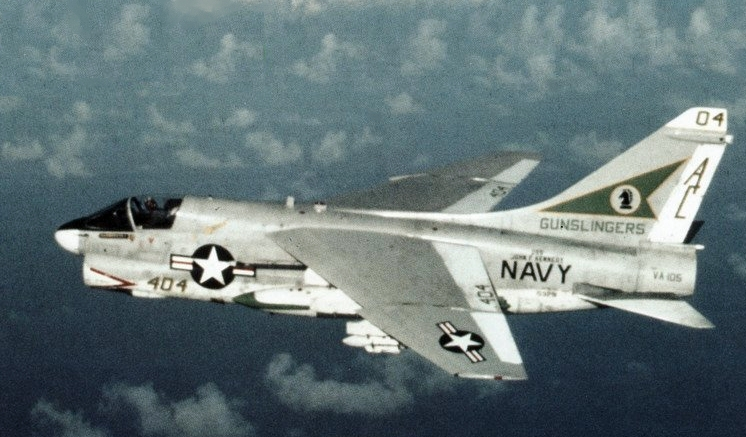
A-7E Corsair II VA-105 in flight 1982

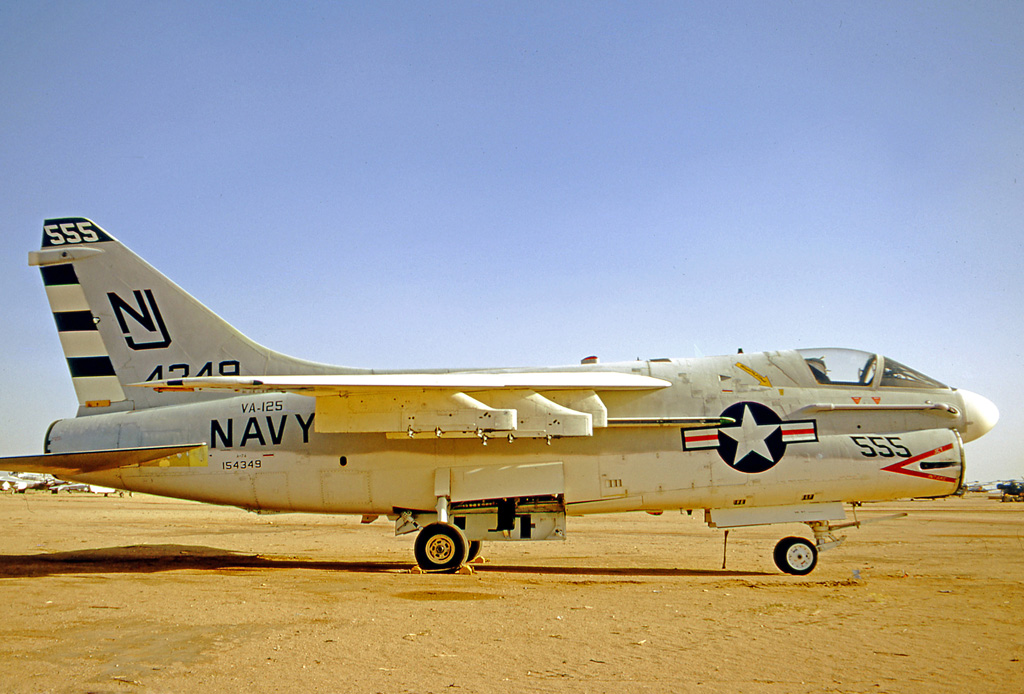
A-7A 154349 VA-125

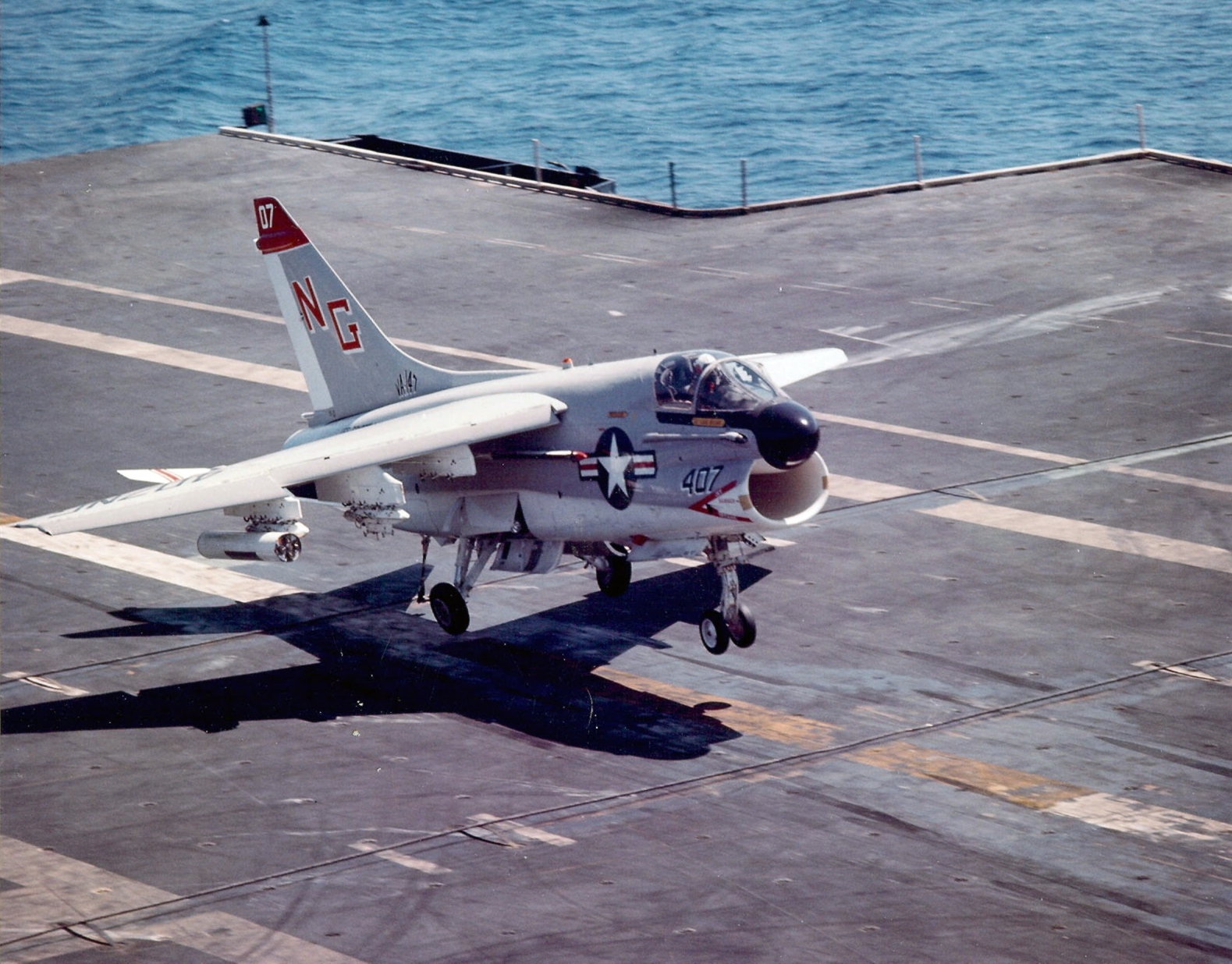
A-7E Corsair II from Attack Squadron VA-147 "Argonauts" landing on an aircraft carrier in the mid-1970s

- VA-15 "Valions" (now VFA-15)
- VA-22 "Fighting Redcocks" (now VFA-22)

Transitioned from A-4F Skyhawk to A-7E January 1971. Two combat cruises to Vietnam. Nine cruises to Mediterranean. Re designated VFA-22 May 4, 1990 and re-equipped with F/A-18C Hornet.

- VA-25 "Fists of the Fleet" (now VFA-25)

Transitioned from A-1H Skyraider to A-7B April 1968. Transitioned from A-7B to A-7E in 1970. 3 combat cruises to Vietnam, 5 cruises to Pacific. Re designated VFA-25 July 1983 and re-equipped with F/A-18A Hornet.

- VA-27 "Royal Maces" (now VFA-27)

Activated September 1,1 967 and equipped with A-7A. Transitioned to A-7E in 1970. 4 combat cruises to Vietnam, 10 cruises to Pacific. Re designated VFA-27 January 24, 1991 and equipped with F/A-18C Hornet.

- VA-37 "Ragin Bulls" (now VFA-37)

Activated July 1, 1967, with A-7A. Transitioned to A-7E December 1973. 2 combat cruises to Vietnam, 10 cruises to Mediterranean. Re designated VFA-37 November 1990 and reequipped with F/A-18C Hornet.

- VA-81 "Sunliners" (now VFA-81)

Transitioned from A-4C to A-7E in 1970. Nine cruises to Mediterranean. Participated in action against Libya. Re designated VFA-81 and reequipped with F/A-18C February 1988.

- VA-83 "Rampagers" (now VFA-83)

Transitioned from A-4E to A-73 in December 1969. 12 cruises to Mediterranean. Action against Libya and Lebanon.

- VA-86 "Sidewinders" (now VFA-86)

Transitioned from A-4E to A-7A March 1967. Became first A-7 operational squadron June 1, 1967. Transitioned to A-7B 1970, to A-7C 1972, and to A-7E March 1975. 4 combat cruises to Tonkin Gulf. 7 cruises to Mediterranean, 2 to North Atlantic., one world cruise. Re designated VFA-86 July 15, 1987 and re-equipped with F/A-18C.

- VA-87 "Golden Warriors" (now VFA-87)

Established February 1, 1968 as first A-7B squadron. Transitioned to A-7E 1975. One combat cruise to Tonkin Gulf. 8 cruises to Mediterranean (2 of these to Indian Ocean as well) Participated in Grenada operation and in Lebanon. Re designated VFA-87 May 1, 1986 and re-equipped with F/A-18A.

- VA-94 "Mighty Shrikes" (now VFA-94)

Transitioned from A-4E to A-7E 1971. 2 combat cruises to Tonkin Gulf. 8 cruises to Western Pacific (5 of these to Indian Ocean as well) 2 cruises to Western Pacific, One to North Pacific, and one world cruise. Re designated VFA-94 June 28, 1990 and re-equipped with F/A-18C.

- VA-97 "Warhawks" (now VFA-97)

Established June 1, 1967, with A-7A. Transitioned to A-7E 1970. 4 combat cruises to Tonkin Gulf. 8 cruises to Western Pacific and Indian Ocean. One cruise to North Pacific and one world cruise. Re designated VFA-97 January 24, 1991 and re-equipped with F/A-18C.

- VA-105 "Gunslingers" (now VFA-105)

Established March 4, 1968, with A-7A. Transitioned to A-7E 1973. 2 combat cruises to Tonkin Gulf. 10 cruises to Mediterranean (2 of these to Indian Ocean as well), one world cruise. Re designated VFA-105 December 17, 1990 and re-equipped with F/A-18C.

- VA-113 "Stingers" (now VFA-113)

Transitioned from A-4F to A-7B 1968. Transitioned to A-7E 1970. 2 combat cruises to Tonkin Gulf. One cruise to Mediterranean, 5 cruises to Western Pacific. Re designated VFA-113 March 25, 1983 and re-equipped with F/A-18A.

- VA-146 "Blue Diamonds" (now VFA-146)

Transitioned from A-4B/E to A-7B 1968. Transitioned to A-7E 1969. 4 combat cruises to Tonkin Gulf, 7 cruises to Western Pacific and Indian Ocean. One world cruise, one cruise to Northern Pacific. Predesignated VFA-146 July 21, 1989 and equipped with F/A-18C.

- VA-147 "Argonauts" (now VFA-147)

Established February 1, 1967, with A-7A, becoming first fleet squadron to receive Corsair II. Received first combat-ready A-7As September 11, 1972. Received first operational A-7E September 17, 1969. 5 combat cruises to Tonking Gulf (with diversion to Korea). 8 cruises to Western Pacific.

- VA-192 "Golden Dragons" (now VFA-192)

Transitioned from A-4E to A-7E February 1970. 2 cruises to Tonkin Gulf, 4 to Western Pacific, 1 to Mediterranean, and 2 to Indian Ocean. Re designated VFA-192 January 10, 1985 and re-equipped with F/A-18A.

- VA-195 "Dambusters" (now VFA-195)

Transitioned from A-4E to A-7E 1970. 2 cruises to Tonkin Gulf, 4 to Western Pacific, 1 to Mediterranean, 1 to Indian Ocean. Re designated VFA-195 April 1, 1985 and equipped with F/A-18A.

Current Naval Reserve squadrons or units that were former A-7 operators

- VA-204 "River Rattlers" (now VFA-204)

Disestablished or deactivated squadrons or units, that had operationally used the A-7 Corsair II

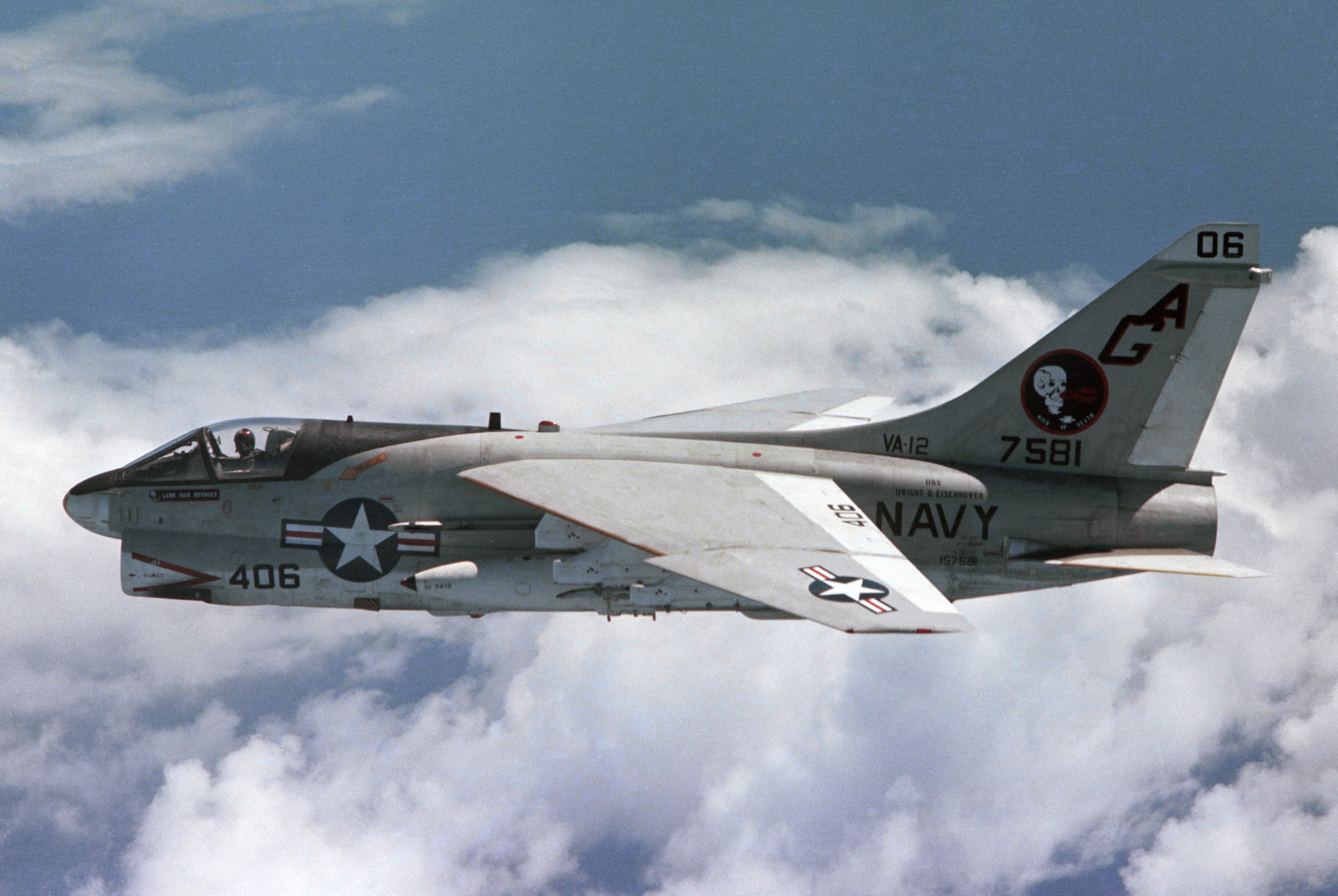
A U.S. Navy LTV A-7E Corsair II aircraft from Attack Squadron 12 (VA-12) Flying Ubangis.

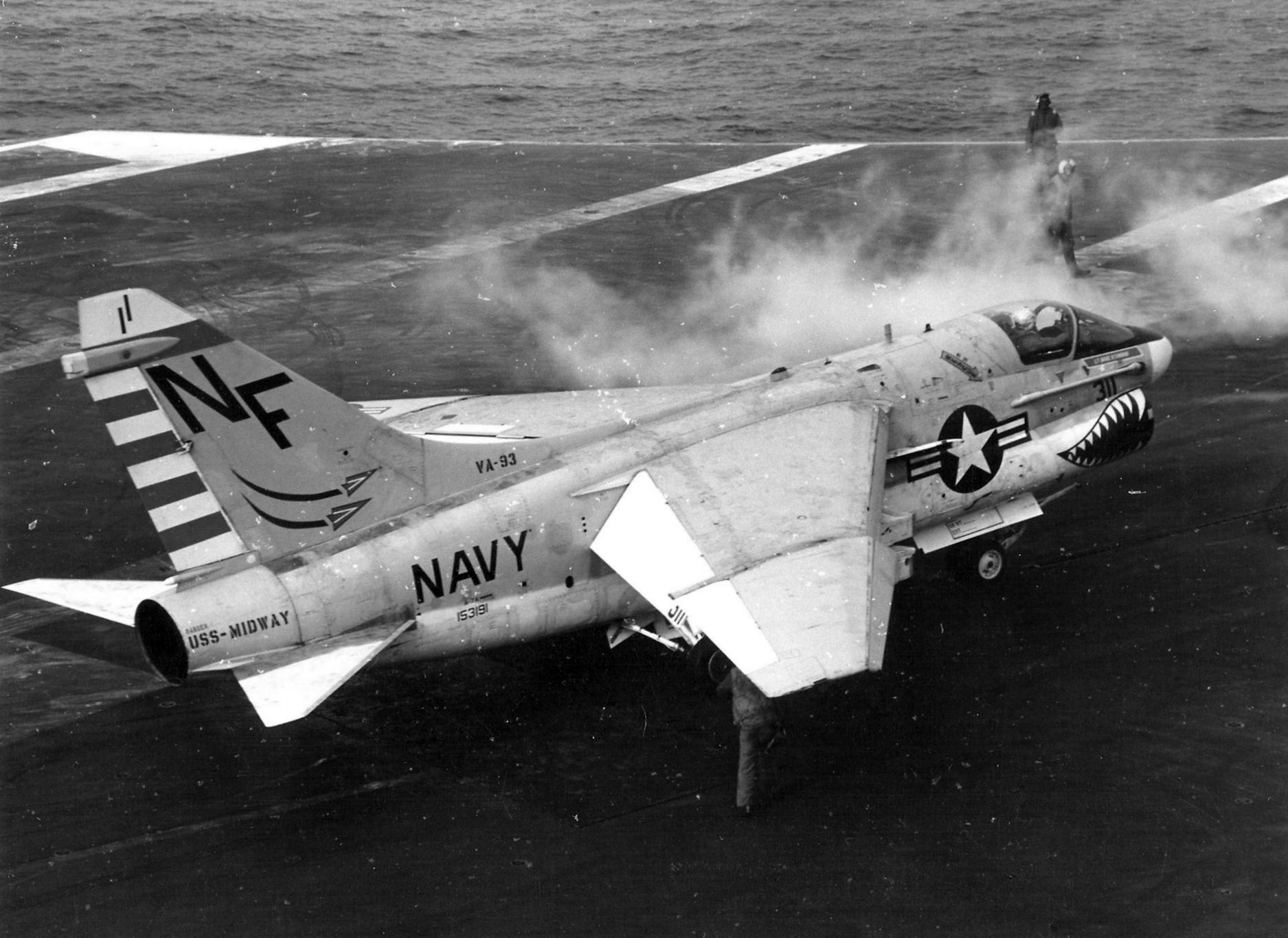
A-7A Corsair of VA-93 on USS Midway c1970

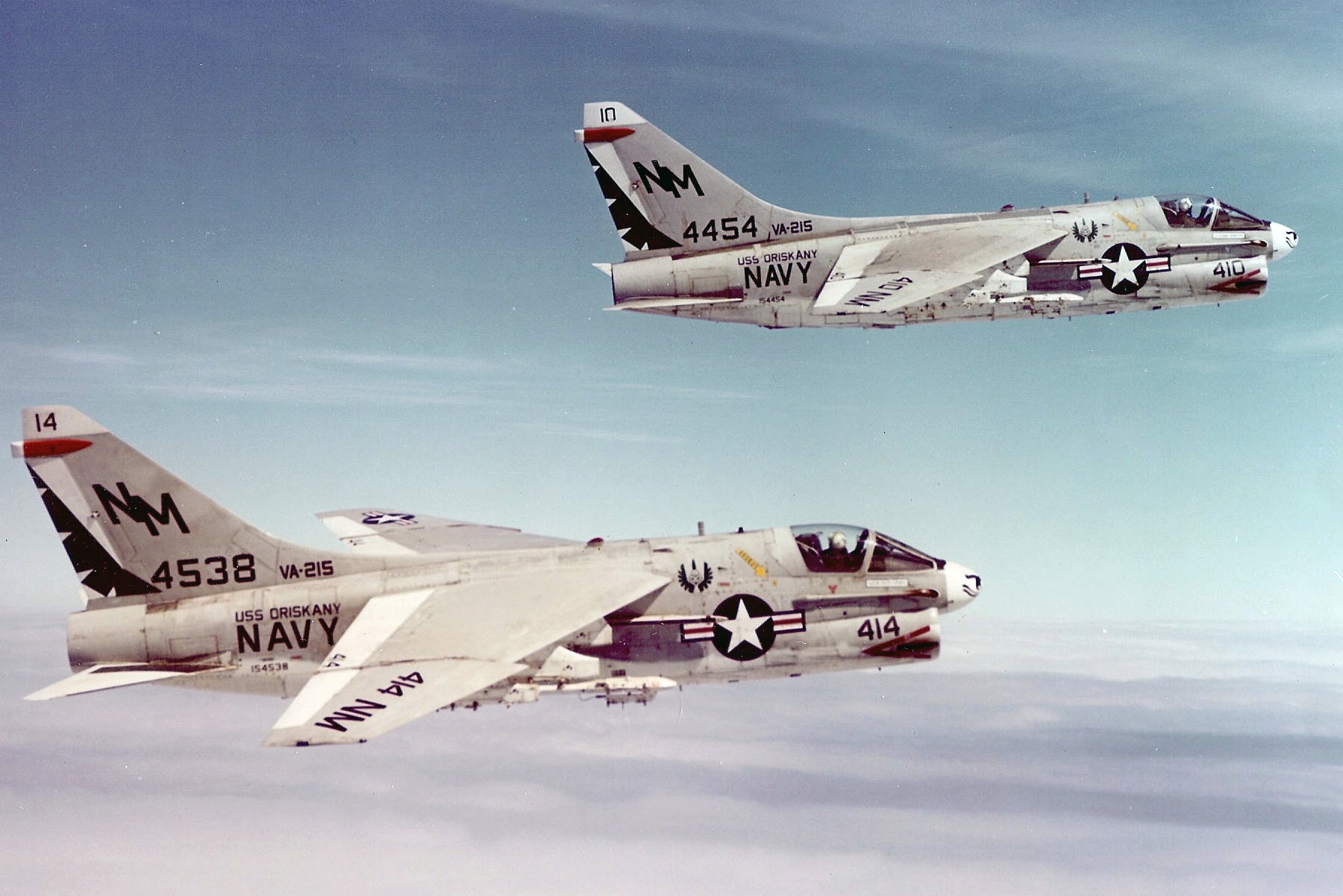
A-7Bs of VA-215 in 1971.

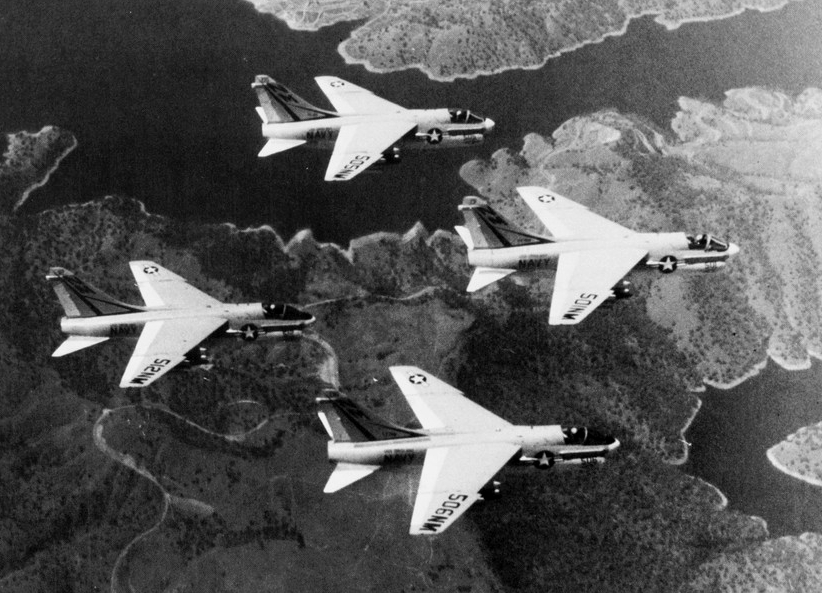
A-7B Corsairs of VA-155 in flight c1972

- VA-12 "Flying Ubangis"

Transformed from A-4C Skyhawk to A-7E December 1970. Seven cruises to Mediterranean. Disestablished October 1, 1986.

- VA-46 "Clansmen"

Transitioned from A-4E to A-7A in 1968, from A-7A to A-7B June 1970, and to A-7E in 1977. 11 cruises to Mediterranean. Disestablished June 30, 1991

- VA-55 "Warhorses"
- VA-56 "Champions"

Transitioned from A-4E to A-7B in 1968, to A-7A in 1973, to A-7E in March 1977. 3 combat cruises to Vietnam. Disestablished Aug 31, 1986.

- VA-66 "The Waldos"

Transitioned from A-4C to A-7E in 1971. Nine cruises to Mediterranean. Disestablished October 1, 1986.

- VA-67 Established August 1967 with A-7B. Redesignated VA-15(2nd) June 1, 1969
- VA-72 "Blue Hawks"

Transitioned from A-4B to A-7B September 1969. Transitioned to A-7E in 1977. 12 cruises to Mediterranean. Participated in action in Lebanon and Persian Gulf. Disestablished June 30, 1991.

- VA-82 "Marauders" (later became VFA-82. Disestablished September 30, 2005)

Activated with A-7A May 1, 1967. Transitioned to A-7E 1970 and to A-7C in 1971, to A-7E Mar 1975. Three combat cruises to Vietnam. Re designated VFA-82 July 15, 1987 and re-equipped with F/A-18C

- VA-93 "Blue Blazers"

Transitioned from A-4F to A-7B 1969. Transitioned to A-7A 1973, to A-7E May 1977. 3 combat cruises to Tonkin Gulf. Transferred to Yokosuka, Japan for deployment aboard USS Midway in 1973. Disestablished August 31, 1986.

- VA-122 "Flying Eagles"

Received first A-7A November 15, 1966 as Pacific Fleet Fleet Readiness Squadron. To A-7B in 1967. Received first fleet A-7E July 1969. Received first TA-7C May 23, 1978. Disestablished May 31, 1991.

- VA-125 "Rough Raiders"

Equipped with A-7A and A-7B 1970. A-7A a training discontinued 1975, A-7B training discontinued 1977. Disestablished October 1977.

- VA-153 "Blue Tail Flies"

Transitioned from A-4F to A-7A in 1969. To A-7B in 1973. 3 cruises to Tonkin Gulf, 2 to Western Pacific, one to Indian Ocean, one to Mediterranean. Disestablished September 30, 1977.

- VA-155 "Silver Foxes"

Transitioned from A-4E to A-7B 1969. 3 cruises to Tonkin Gulf, 2 to Western Pacific, 1 to Indian Ocean, and one to Mediterranean. Disestablished September 30, 1977.

- VA-174 "The Hellrazors"

VF-174 re designated VA-174 July 1, 1966 as Fleet Readiness Squadron for A-7. Received A-7A Oct 1966, A-7E Dec 1969, TA-7C July 1978. Disestablished June 30, 1988.

- VA-203 "Blue Dolphins" (later became VFA-203. Deactivated June 30, 2004)
- VA-205 "Green Falcons"
- VA-215 "Barn Owls"

Established March 1, 1968, with A-7B. 3 cruises to Tonkin Gulf, 2 to Mediterranean, 2 to West Pacific. Disestablished September 30, 1977.

- VA-303 "Golden Hawks" (later became VFA-303. Disestablished December 31, 1994)
- VA-304 "Firebirds"
- VA-305 "Hackers", later "Lobos" (Later became VFA-305. Disestablished December 31, 1994)

Other Squadrons or Units

- VAQ-33 "Firebirds" (EA-7L)
- VAQ-34 "The Flashbacks / EW Agressors" (EA-7L)
- VX-5 "Vampires"
- The Naval Strike Warfare Center
