= 201 Squadron (Portugal) =

Portuguese military unit

- Esquadra 201
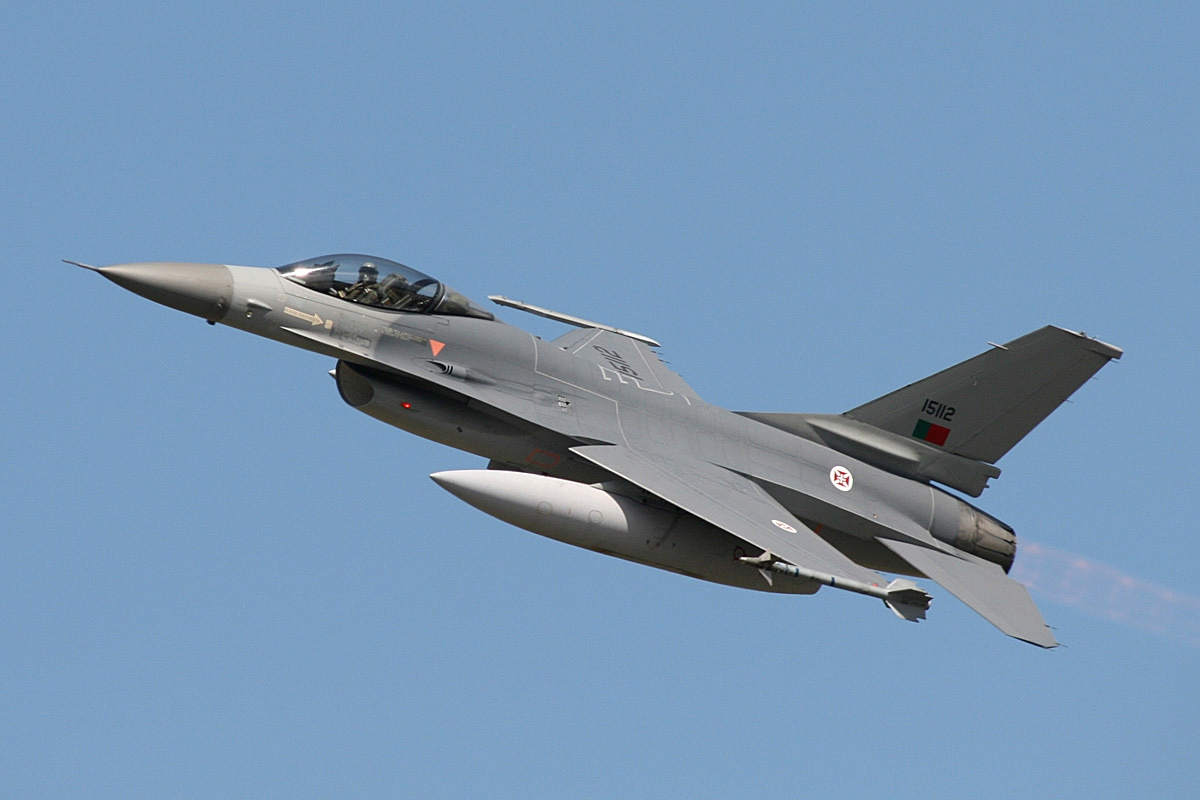
- F-16 Fighting Falcon of 201 Squadron
- Active: February 4, 1958 – June 1, 1981, as 50 and 51 Squadron; October 4, 1993
- Country: Portugal
- Branch: Air Force
- Type: Fighter squadron
- Home Base: Air Base No. 2 (1958–1959); Air Base No. 5 (1959–present)
- Nickname: Falcões (Falcons)
- Mottos: "Guerra ou paz tanto nos faz" (War or peace, it doesn't matter to us)
- Anniversaries: October 4

Commanders
- Current commander: Maj. Tomás Virgílio

Insignia
- Badge: Diving Falcon

Aircraft flown
- Fighter: F-86 Sabre (1958–1980); Fiat G-91 (1965–1974); F-16 Fighting Falcon
- Trainer: T-33 Silver Star (1961–1970); T-38 Talon (1977–1980)

201 Squadron "Falcões" (Esquadra 201) is a fighter squadron of the Portuguese Air Force, operating the F-16 Fighting Falcon.

== Roles and missions ==
201 Sqn has as its primary mission the execution of air defense operations and conventional attack:

- Air defense operations;
- Offensive air operations, with the exception of suppression of enemy air defenses (SEAD);
- Anti-surface operations (ASFAO), to include aerial interdiction (AI), close air support (CAS), anti-surface warfare (ASuW) with the exception of anti-submarine warfare (ASW).

== History ==
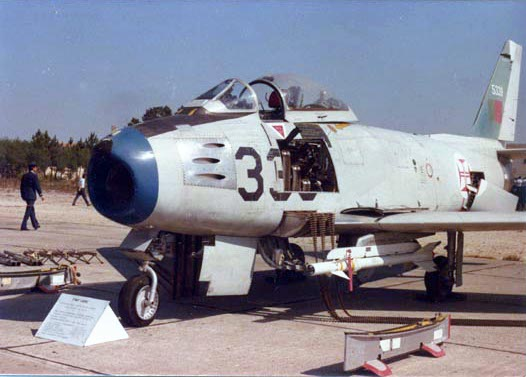
Portuguese F-86F displayed at Monte Real Air Base. Note the blue nose scheme used by aircraft of 51 Squadron

The origins of 201 Squadron "Falcões" date back to the creation of 50 Squadron "Falcões" (Falcons) in 1958, based at Ota (then designated Air Base No. 2), operating the F-86F Sabre. On September 11, 1958, the squadron's designation was changed to 51 Squadron and it was later transferred to Air Base No. 5, in Monte Real, on October 4, 1959. The squadron became part of 501st Operational Group.

The first F-86F flight by a Portuguese pilot took place on September 22, 1958, by 50 Squadron. Two days later, on September 24, a F-86F breaks for the first time the sound barrier in Portugal.

In the beginning of the 1960s, the flight demonstration team "Dragões" (Dragons) was reactivated with the F-86F as part of 51 Squadron.

On August 15, 1961, a detachment of eight F-86F fighters was deployed to Guinea-Bissau until October 1964, in what was called Operation Atlas (Portuguese: Operação Atlas), during which they flew 577 sorties, of which 430 were ground-attack missions.

From 1961 to 1970 51 Squadron also operated five T-33 AN Silver Star aircraft; having also operated the Fiat G-91 R4 from November 1965 to 1974. These were used in the transition and conversion of fighter pilots from the F-86F to the G.91 that were in the Portuguese African colonies.

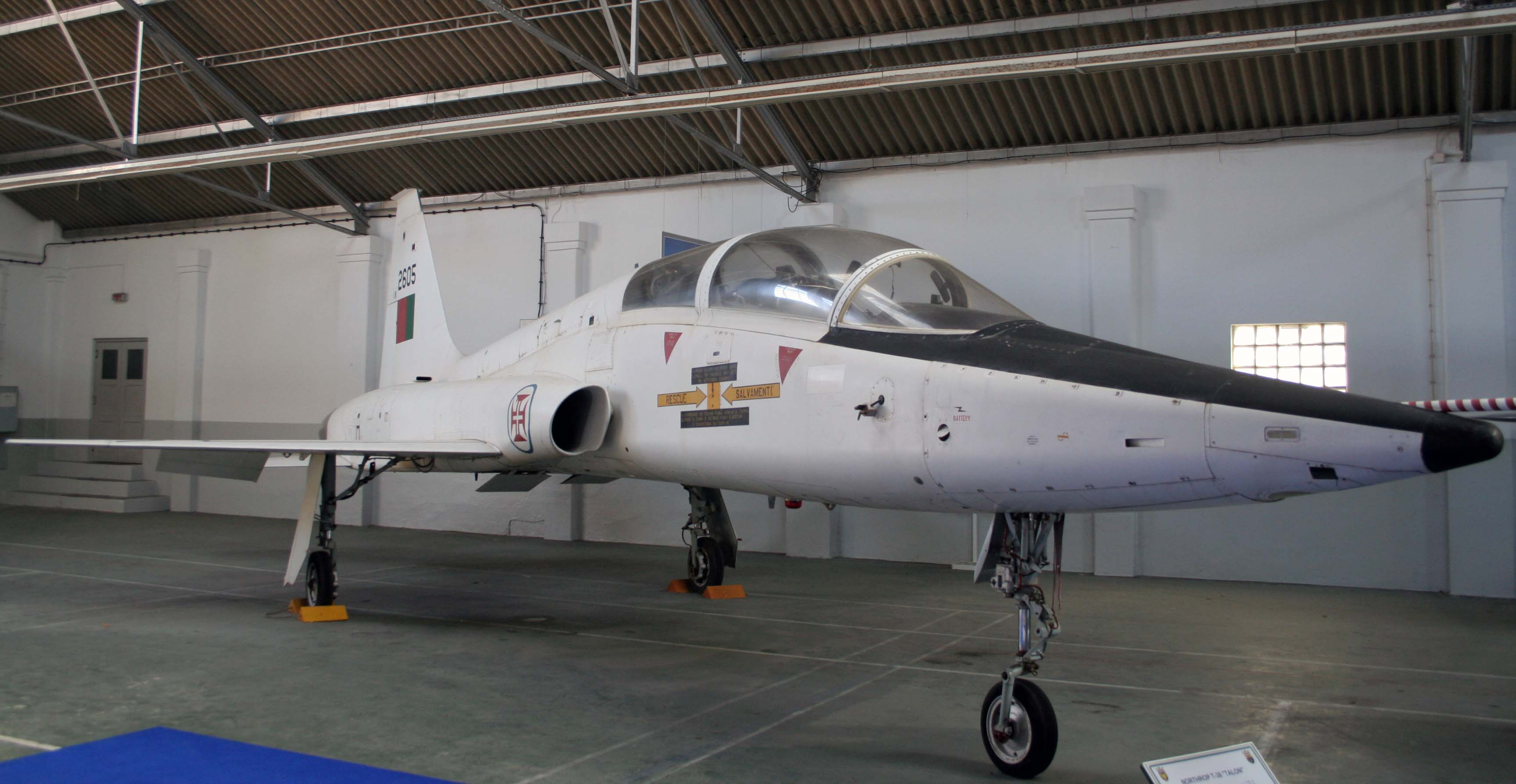
PoAF T-38A Talon, nicknamed "Falcão Branco" (White Falcon)

Starting in 1977, 51 Squadron additionally operated six T-38A Talon in advanced combat training, with a second batch of six T-38A aircraft being delivered and operated by 1980. Later that year all T-38 trainers were transferred to 103 Squadron, also based at Monte Real.

With further reorganizations of the Air Force, the operational group of which the squadron was part of was re-designated as Operational Group 51 (Portuguese: Grupo Operacional 51), and in 1978 the squadron's own designation was changed to 201 Squadron.

The F-86F Sabre ended its service in the Portuguese Air Force officially on July 31, 1980, and 201 Squadron was later disbanded on June 1, 1981.

In 1981, 302 Squadron, to which the missions of tactical air support for maritime operations (TASMO) and air interdiction were assigned, was activated and the squadron continued to serve with the traditions of the "Falcões".

201 Squadron was reactivated on October 4, 1993, with aerial defense as its mission, the first F-16 Fighting Falcon arriving in June 1994. In 1997 the squadron initiated its qualification in air-to-ground missions and in July 1998 it was attributed the primary mission of air defense operations and close air support and air interdiction as secondary missions. In 1999, the tactical air support for maritime operations (TASMO) was also assigned as one of its secondary missions.

On May 26, 2011, the squadron officially started operating the upgraded F-16 MLU fighter.

=== Lineage ===
- Constituted as Esquadra 50 (50 Squadron) on February 4, 1958
  Re-designated as Esquadra 51 (51 Squadron) on September 11, 1958
  Re-designated as Esquadra 201 (201 Squadron) in 1978
  Disbanded on June 1, 1981
- Reactivated as Esquadra 201 (201 Squadron) on October 4, 1993

== Aircraft ==
- F-86 Sabre F (1958–1980)
- Five T-33 Silver Star AN (1961–1970)
- Fiat G-91 R4 (1965–1974)
- T-38 Talon A (1977–1980)
- F-16 Fighting Falcon A (1994–2010)
- F-16 Fighting Falcon M (2010–Present)

== Notable pilots ==
- Captain António Roque: first Portuguese pilot to reach 1000 flight hours in F-16s (1999)

== Deployments ==
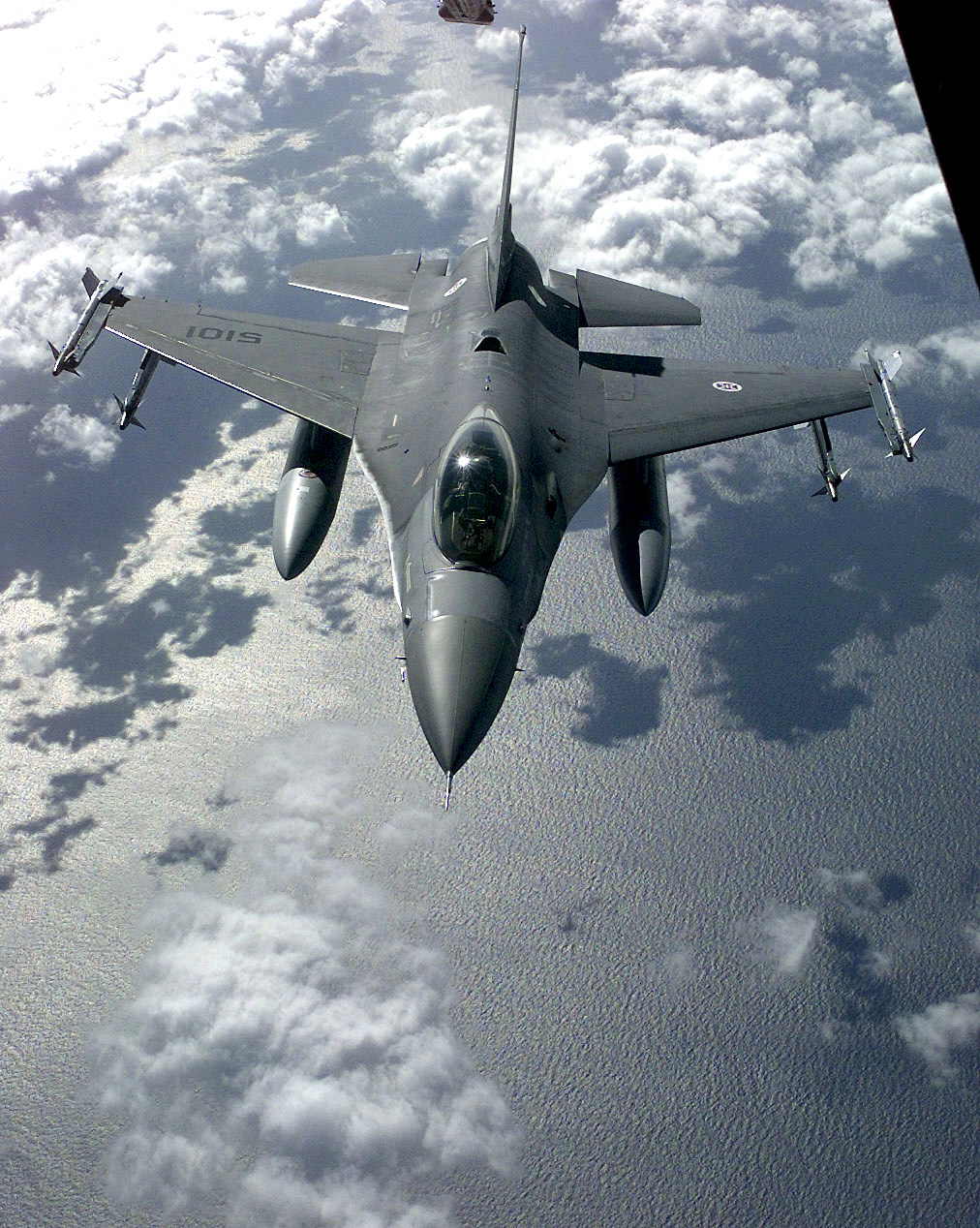
A PoAF F-16 armed with four Sidewinder air-to-air missiles and equipped with an AN/ALQ-131 ECM pod, prepares to refuel from a USAF KC-10 while conducting a CAP, during Operation Allied Force, March 1999.

- Operation Allied Force (the NATO bombing of Yugoslavia) (March 23, 1999 – June 10, 1999)
  201 Squadron was deployed to Italy with a detachment of three F-16s. Since these aircraft were not converted to MLU standards, they were restricted to combat air patrol (CAP) missions during the conflict.
- Exercise Red Flag (2000)
  The Portuguese detachment consisted of six F-16s.
- Operation Baltic Air Policing (November 1, 2007 – December 15, 2007)
  201 Squadron participated in patrolling the skies of the Baltic states (Lithuania, Estonia and Latvia) with four F-16 A Block 15 along with two F-16 AM of 301 Squadron.

== See also ==
- Portuguese Air Force
- List of F-16 Fighting Falcon operators
- Portuguese Colonial War
- 301 Squadron
- 302 Squadron
- Davis-Monthan Air Force Base
