= 302 Squadron (Portugal) =

- Esquadra 302
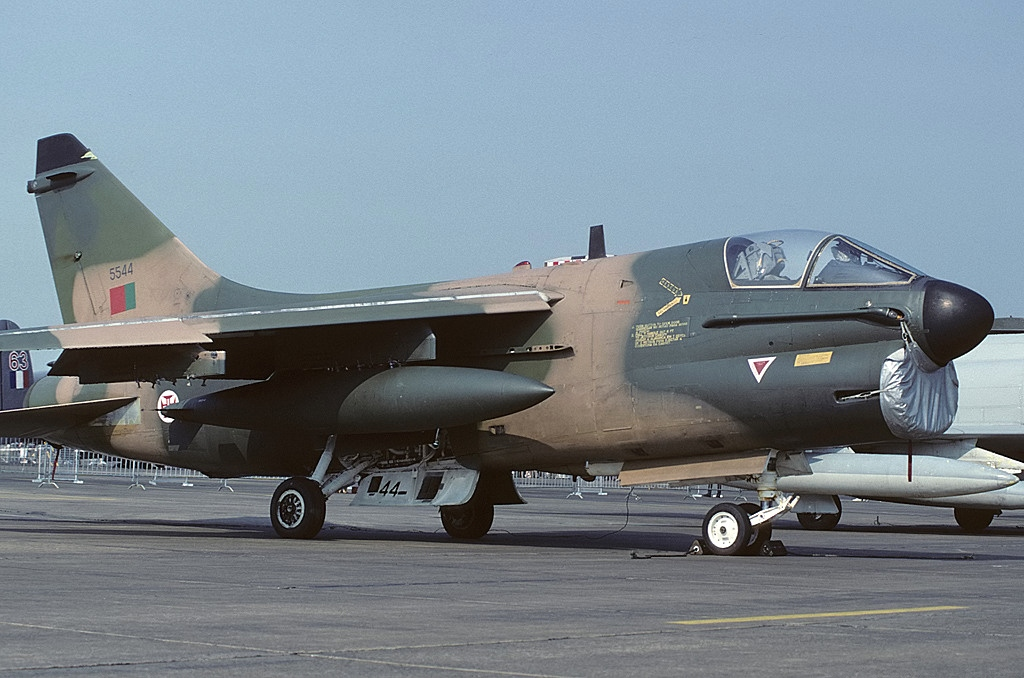
- Former Portuguese Air Force LTV A-7P Corsair II
- Active: July 1981
- Disbanded: May 1996
- Country: Portugal
- Branch: Air Force
- Air Base: Air Base No. 5
- Nicknames: Falcões (Falcons) (1981–1993); Águias Reais (Royal Eagles) (1993–1996)
- Mottos: Poder na guerra, nobreza na paz (Power in war, nobility in peace)

Aircraft flown
- Attack: A-7 Corsair II
- Interceptor: A-7 Corsair II

The 302 Squadron "Falcões" / "Águias Reais" (Esquadra 302) was an attack and air defense squadron of the Portuguese Air Force (PoAF) disbanded in 1996.

== Roles and missions ==
The Attack Squadron 302 "Falcões" had as its primary mission the tactical air support for maritime operations (TASMO), and has its secondary missions air defense and air interdiction (AI).

During the Cold War, the 302 Sqn. had the mission to ensure the defense of the North Atlantic Ocean to ensure and support NATO's ability to rearm and resupply Europe during times of war.

== History ==
Activated in July 1981 under the command of Lieutenant Colonel Vitor Rodrigues da Silva, the 302 Squadron "Falcões" adopted and continued the tradition of the then-disbanded 201 Squadron and of the former PoAF "Falcões" squadrons. On December 24, 1981, the 302 Sqn. started to operate the first delivered A-7P Corsair II.

With the reactivation of 201 Squadron "Falcões" in 1993, the nickname of the 302 Sqn. was changed to "Águias Reais" (Royal Eagles). In 1996 the squadron was disbanded and its human and aircraft resources were integrated with its sister squadron, 304 Squadron "Magníficos", until that squadron's retirement in 1999.

== Aircraft ==
- LTV A-7P Corsair II (1981–1996)
- TA-7C Corsair II (1982–1984)
  Nicknamed pomba branca (White dove) due to the United States Navy's painting Aircraft leased by the United States Navy to Portugal for the operational conversion of A-7 pilots before the delivery of the first TA-7P Corsair II bought in a second order that same year.

== Commanders ==
- Lt. Colonel PILAV Vitor Rodrigues da Silva (July, 1981 – January, 1983)
- Major PILAV Cândido Duarte Reis (January, 1983 – October, 1984)
- Major PILAV José Jordão (October, 1984 – September, 1985)
- Major PILAV Armando Teixeira Marques (September, 1985 – May, 1986)
- Major PILAV João Brandão Ferreira (May, 1986 – September, 1988)
- Major PILAV Carlos Guerra (September, 1988 – July, 1989)
- Lt. Colonel PILAV Joaquim Augusto Soares (July, 1989 – December, 1989)
- Major PILAV Francisco Martins Batista (March, 1990 – November, 1992)
- Major PILAV Joaquim Soares de Almeida (November, 1992 – June, 1994)
- Major PILAV Carlos Barata dos Santos (June, 1994 – March, 1996)
- Major PILAV Eurico Craveiro (March, 1996)
- Major PILAV Rui Elvas (interim) (March, 1996 – May, 1996)

== See also ==
- Portuguese Air Force
- Cold War
- Northern Wedding
- 201 Squadron
- List of A-7 Corsair II operators
