= Monte Real Air Base =

Portuguese military airbase

Monte Real Air Base Air Base 5
- Base Aérea de Monte Real; Base Aérea Nº 5
- Monte Real, Leiria in Portugal
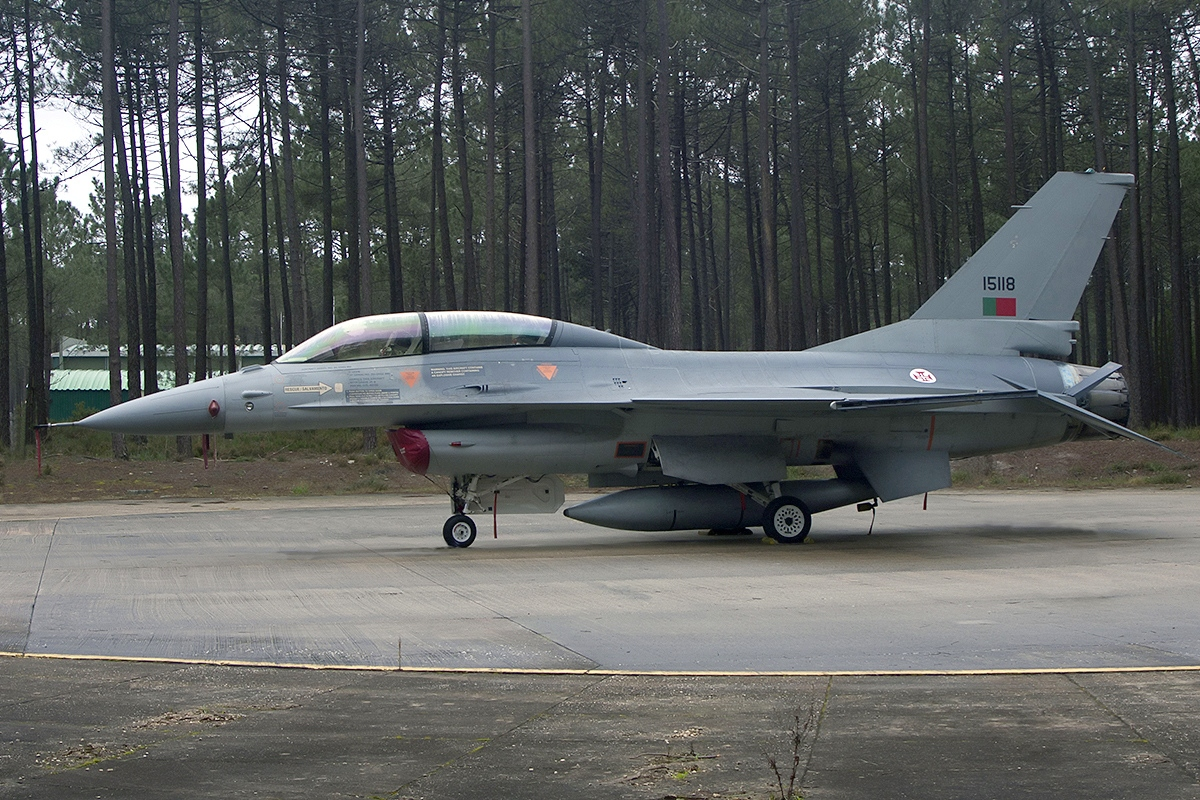
- A Portuguese Air Force F-16B Fighting Falcon at Monte Real AB

- Alcança quem não cansa (Portuguese for 'He/she who never tires, reaches')

Site information
- Type: Military airfield
- Owner: Ministry of National Defence
- Operator: Portuguese Air Force
- Controlled by: Air Command
- Condition: Operational
- Website: Official website

Location
- Location in Portugal
- Coordinates: 39°49′42″N 008°53′15″W

Site history
- Built: 1957–1959
- In use: 4 October 1959 – present

Garrison information
- Current commander: Colonel João Paulo Nunes Vicente
- Garrison: 51st Operational Group

Airfield information
- Identifiers: IATA: QLR, ICAO: LPMR, WMO: 085400
- Elevation: 26.5 metres (87 ft) AMSL
Runways
| Direction | Length and surface |
|---|---|
| 01/19 | 2,743 metres (8,999 ft) Concrete |

Monte Real Air Base, officially designated as Air Force Base No. 5 (Portuguese: Base Aérea Nº 5, BA5), is a Portuguese Air Force (PoAF) air base located in Monte Real, Leiria, Portugal. Its mission is to guarantee the readiness and deployment of the air force units based there. Since its opening in October 1959, the base has been home to the air force's jet fighter aircraft, with several of the units based there being equipped with F-86F Sabre, Fiat G.91, T-33 Shooting Star, T-38 Talon and A-7 Corsair II aircraft.

The base is currently home to two F-16 Fighting Falcon squadrons.

== History ==
The air base is located at the former installations of the aero club of Leiria, that existed from 1938 to 1941, when it became a military aerodrome of the Portuguese Army's aviation service. In 1952 the Army's aviation and the Portuguese Navy's aviation service were merged, resulting in the creation of the Portuguese Air Force, but the aerodrome wasn't actively used until the air base was established in 1959.

Construction of the air base began in 1957 and was completed in 1959, it being officially inaugurated on 4 October by the President of the Republic Admiral Américo Tomás. That same year the first Portuguese F-86F Sabre squadron, Esquadra 50 "Falcões", that was created the previous year, was transferred to Monte Real and was re-designated as 51 Squadron "Falcões" (Falcons). At the same time a second F-86F squadron, 52 Squadron "Galos" (Roosters), was also formed.

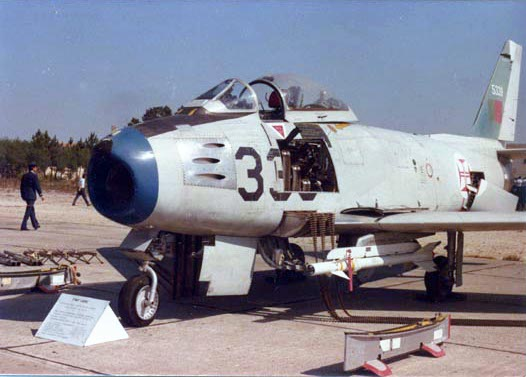
Portuguese F-86F displayed at Monte Real Air Base

Adopting the motto "Alcança Quem Não Cansa" ('He/She who never tires, reaches"), these two squadrons became part of the new Operational Group 501 and together totaled 50 F-86F combat aircraft. This number was later increased to 65 fighters. 52 Squadron was disbanded on 12 July 1961.

Between 1974 and 1987 the Advanced Fighter Training Squadron (Portuguese: Esquadra de Instrução Complementar de Aviões de Caça, E.I.C.P.A.C.), later re-designated as 103 Squadron, was based at Monte Real and operated the T-33A Shooting Star and T-38A Talon.

On 24 December 1981, a new chapter began at Air Base No. 5 with the arrival of first nine A-7P Corsair II fighter aircraft. The number eventually grew to 20, and these aircraft formed 302 Attack Squadron, taking on the symbols and traditions of the 51 Squadron "Falcões."

On 28 June 1984, during a meeting of the NATO Commission of Infrastructures in Brussels, Monte Real was formally accepted as NATO infrastructure to be equipped with two attack squadrons of A-7P aircraft and a future interceptor squadron.

On the 25th anniversary of the inauguration of Monte Real Air Base, 4 October 1984, the 304 Attack Squadron was officially activated and became the second attack squadron with A-7P aircraft. This squadron became the heir of the traditions, symbols, and deeds of the 93 Squadron "Magníficos" (Magnificents), deactivated at Air Base No. 9, in 1973 in Luanda, Africa.

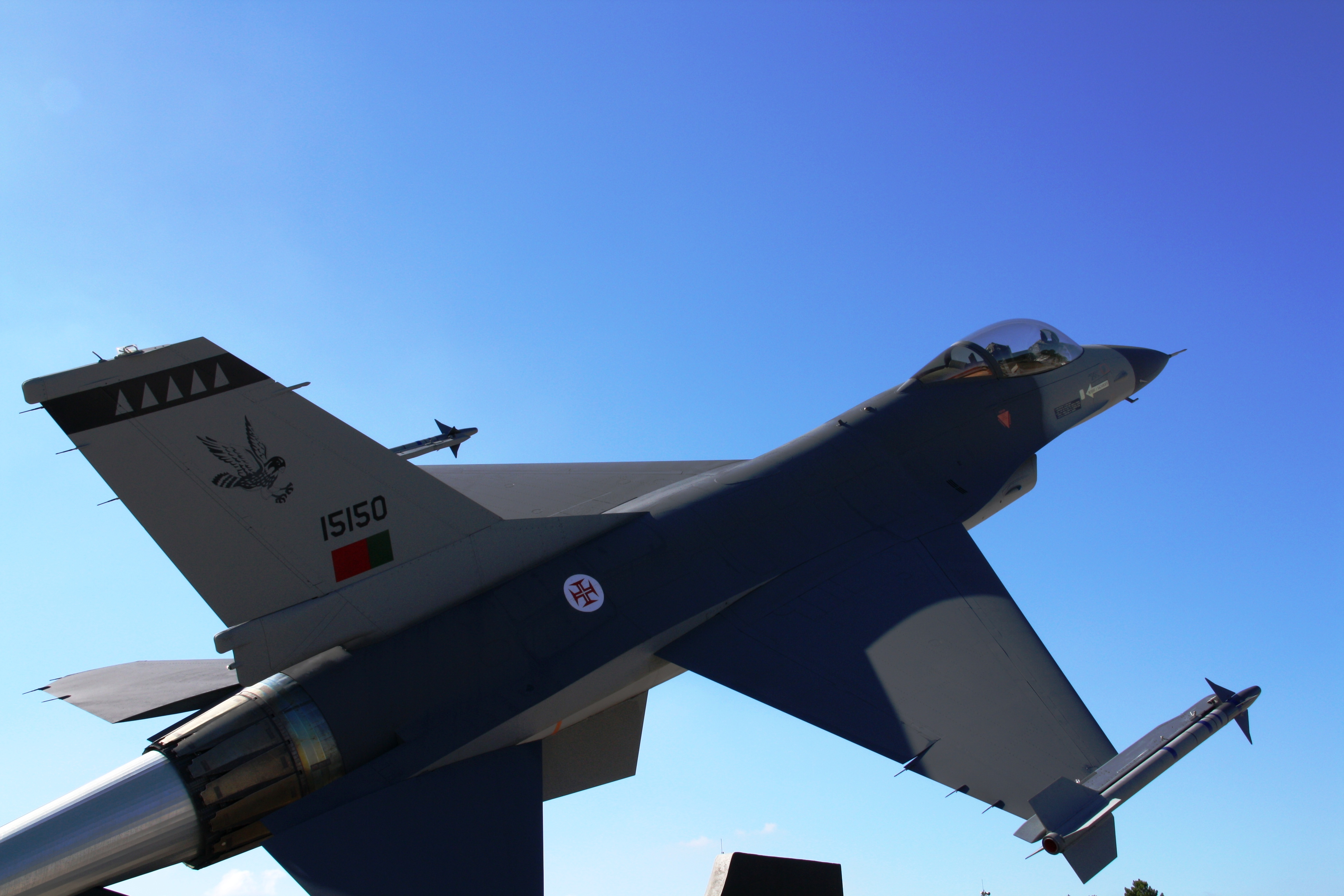
F-16A Fighting Falcon preserved as a gate guardian at Monte Real Air Base

On 4 October 1993, the 201 Squadron was activated and equipped with F-16 Fighting Falcon fighters. This squadron resumed the air defence mission, and inherited the traditions and symbol of the "Falcões."

On 25 November 2005, 301 Squadron was transferred to Air Base No. 5 from Air Base No. 11 in Beja and received the first F-16 fighters upgraded with the Mid-Life Update (F-16AM and F-16BM) of the Portuguese Air Force. The squadron maintained the symbols and traditions of the "Jaguares" (Jaguars).

Work on the PoAF's F-16 Mid-Life Update program is carried out at the workshops at Monte Real Air Base, namely the facilities designated as dock 4 (Portuguese: Doca 4), as well the flight testing of the upgraded aircraft.

On 28 January 2026, Storm Kristin caused major material damage at Monte Real Air Base (BA5). The Portuguese Air Force said that no injuries were reported, while Portuguese media and Reuters reported that F-16 aircraft at the base were damaged during the storm. A gust of 178 km/h (111 mph) was observed before the monitoring equipment failed.

== Tenant units ==
Monte Real Air Base hosts the 51st Operational Group (GO51). The GO51's operational fighter squadrons are:

- 201 Fighter Squadron "Falcões" (Falcons)
- 301 Fighter Squadron "Jaguares" (Jaguars)

Both squadrons fly the F-16 Fighting Falcon.

=== Former tenant units ===
- 51 Squadron "Falcões" (1959–1978)
- 52 Squadron "Roosters" (1959–1961)
- E.I.C.P.A.C. (1974–1987)
- 302 Squadron (1981–1996)
- 304 Squadron (1984–1999)

== Infrastructures ==
The base has one runway:

- Ident.: 01/19
- QFU: 007º/187º
- LDA: 8,000 ft / 2.438 m
- TORA: 9,000 ft / 2.743 m
- Width: 148 ft / 45 m
- ILS: Yes
- PCN: 027RAWT

There are four main apron areas (A1 to D1) on the East side of the base, and some twenty parking bays on the west side.

== See also ==
- Portuguese Air Force
- Exercise Real Thaw
- Field Firing Range of Alcochete
