= 304 Squadron (Portugal) =

- Esquadra 304
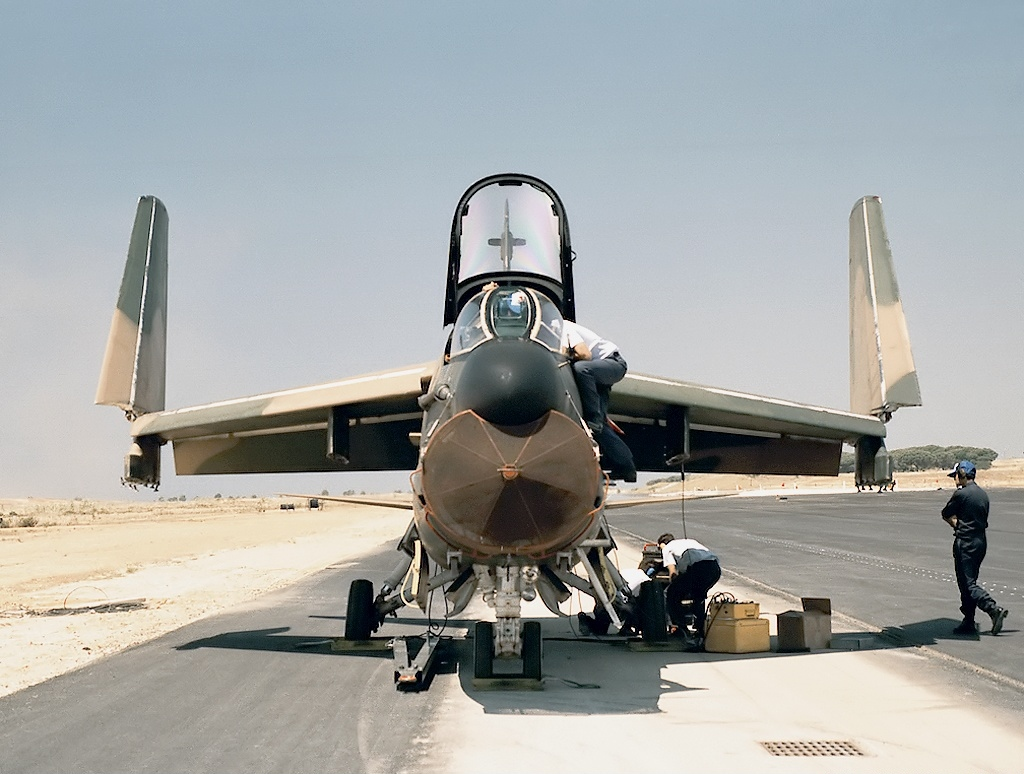
- Former Portuguese Air Force LTV A-7P Corsair II
- Active: October 4, 1984
- Disbanded: July, 1999
- Country: Portugal
- Branch: Air Force
- Air Base: Air Base No. 5
- Nickname(s): Magníficos (Magnificent)
- Motto(s): Na paz... pacíficos, na guerra... terríficos (At peace... peaceful, at war... terrifying)
- Mascot(s): Tiger

Insignia
- Badge: Tiger's head

Aircraft flown
- Attack: A-7 Corsair II
- Fighter: A-7 Corsair II

The 304 Squadron "Magníficos" (Esquadra 304) is an attack and air defense squadron of the Portuguese Air Force (PoAF) disbanded in 1999.

== Roles and missions ==
Primary missions:

- Tactical air support for maritime operations (TASMO),
- Aerial interdiction (AI)

Secondary missions:

- Defensive counter air operations (DCA),
- Offensive counter air operations (OCA)

== History ==
In May, 1983, Portugal concluded the renegotiation of the contract for the purchase of ex-USN A-7 Corsair II aircraft, resulting in a second order of 30 Corsair II (24 A-7P and six TA-7P), adding to the 20 A-7P already delivered between 1981 and 1982. Subsequently, to this additional purchase the 304 Squadron "Magníficos" was activated on October 4, 1984, commanded by Major Botelho da Costa. The primary missions of tactical air support for maritime operations (TASMO) and aerial interdiction (AI), and the secondary missions of defensive and offensive counter air operations (DCA/OCA) were assigned to the squadron upon its creation.

It was disbanded in July, 1999, with the retirement of the A-7P Corsair II fleet in service with the Portuguese Air Force.

== Aircraft ==
- LTV A-7P Corsair II (1984–1999)
- TA-7C Corsair II (1984)
  Nicknamed pomba branca (White dove) due to its white United States Navy painting, this aircraft was leased to Portugal for the operational conversion of A-7 pilots before the delivery of the first TA-7P Corsair II bought in a second order that same year.

== Commanders ==
- Major PILAV Tito Botelho da Costa (October, 1984 – January, 1988)
- Major PILAV Carlos Donato (January, 1988 – October, 1988)
- Major PILAV José Araújo Pinheiro (October, 1988 – September, 1990)
- Major PILAV José Ramos Tareco (September, 1990 – May, 1991)
- Major PILAV Fernando da Silva Dias (May, 1991 – November, 1992)
- Major PILAV Vítor Francisco (November, 1992 – September, 1993)
- Major PILAV António Leitão (September, 1993 – May, 1994)
- Major PILAV Joaquim Nunes Borrego (May, 1994 – January, 1996)
- Major PILAV Otílio Machado (January, 1996 – May, 1997)
- Major PILAV Manuel Rafael Martins (May, 1997 – July, 1998)
- Major PILAV Rui Elvas (July, 1998 – July, 1999)

== See also ==
- Portuguese Air Force
- Cold War
- Northern Wedding
- 302 Squadron
- List of A-7 Corsair II operators
