= 340 Squadron =

340 Squadron can refer to:

- No. 340 Squadron RAF, a Free French unit in World War II
- 340th Squadron (HAF), Hellenic Air Force
- 340th Expeditionary Air Refueling Squadron, United States Air Force
- 340th Weapons Squadron, United States Air Force
