= 340th Squadron (HAF) =

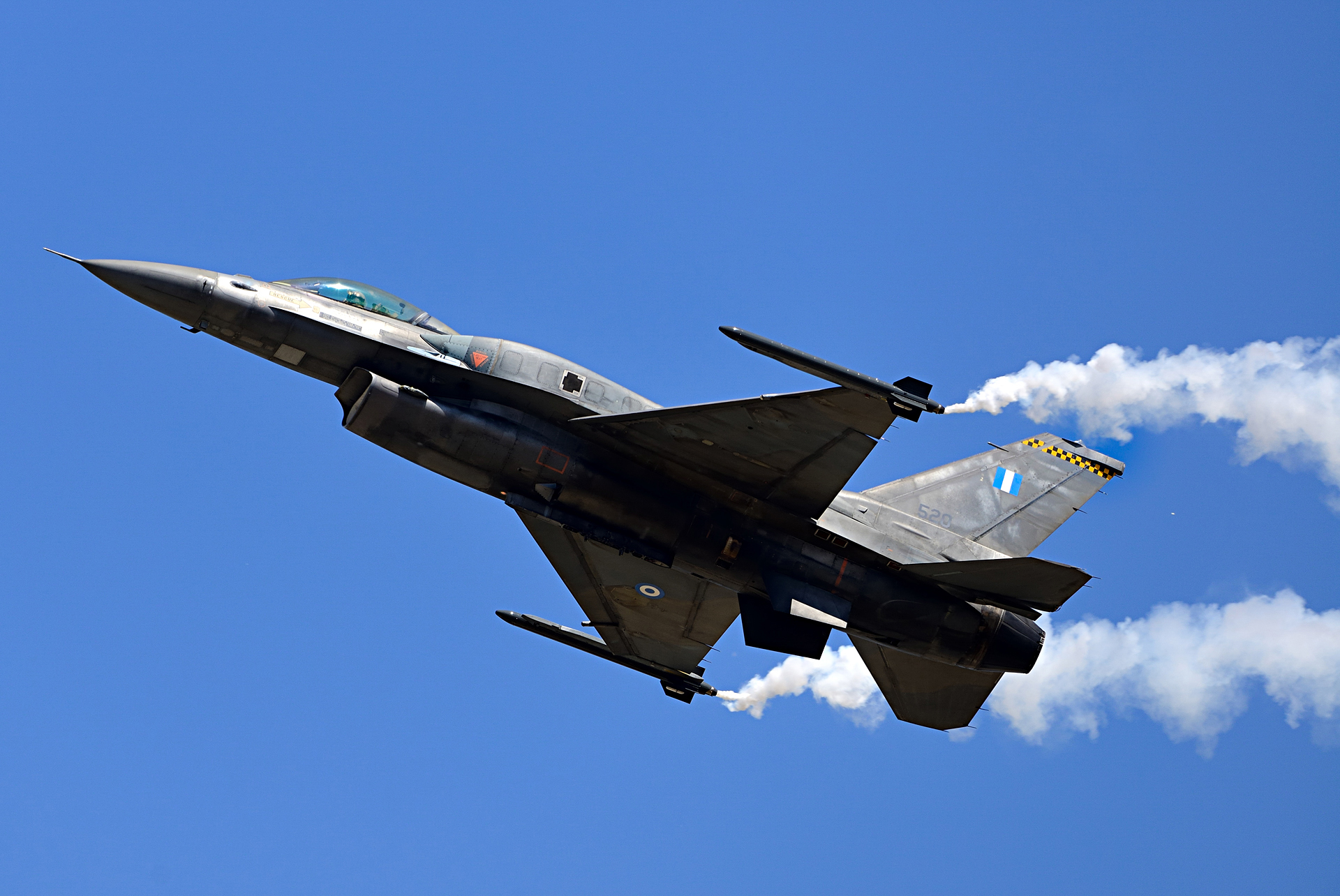
- F-16 of 340th Squadron at the Royal International Air Tattoo 2018
- Active: 1953–2001, 2003–today
- Branch: Hellenic Air Force
- Part of: 115th Combat Wing
- Garrison/HQ: Souda Air Base

Aircraft flown
- Fighter: F-84G (1953–1958); F-84F (1958–1975); A-7H Corsair (1975–2001); F-16 Block 52+ (2003–)

The 340th Squadron (Greek: 340 Μοίρα, 340 M), callsign "Fox" (ΑΛΕΠΟΥ), is a squadron in service with the Hellenic Air Force, forming part of the 115th Combat Wing. It is based at Souda Air Base, and operates the F-16 Block 52+ aircraft.

== History ==
The squadron was established on 18 April 1953 as the 340 Fighter-Bomber Squadron (340 Μοίρα Διώξεως/Βομβαρδισμού), at the Elefsis Air Base, equipped with F-84G Thunderjets. In September it moved to the newly established Nea Anchialos Air Base. In May 1958, the squadron began delivery of F-84F Thunderstreaks, moving in February 1960 to 115th Combat Group (later the 115th Combat Wing) at Akrotiri, Crete.

In July 1964, the 340th Fighter-Bomber Squadron was renamed into 338th Fighter-Bomber Squadron, and the hitherto 335th Strike Squadron assumed the numbering of 340th Strike Squadron (340 Μοίρα Κρούσης). It was renamed again to 340 Fighter-Bomber Squadron in October 1966. In 1974, the squadron took over the F-84Fs of the sister 338th and 339th squadrons, reaching a strength of 75 aircraft. During the emergency after the Turkish invasion of Cyprus in July 1974, this allowed the squadron to establish three detachments, which soon were spun off into separate squadrons: 3401st, 3402nd, and 3403rd. As the squadron began receiving its new A-7H Corsair aircraft in August 1975, it was renamed the 340th Bomber Squadron (340 Μοίρα Βομβαρδισμού) and handed over its own remaining F-84Fs, as well as much of its personnel, to the sister 345th Fighter-Bomber Squadron (former 3402nd).

In 1992, the squadron was reinforced with half of the A-7Hs of the disbanded 347th Bomber Squadron. 340th Bomber Squadron was disbanded on 30 January 2001, its aircraft and part of its personnel once again being transferred to the 345th Squadron. The squadron was reactivated on 3 March 2003, still at 115th Combat Wing, operating with F-16 Block 52+ aircraft, as the 340th Squadron.
