= LTV A-7 Corsair II =

American attack aircraft family

A-7 Corsair II
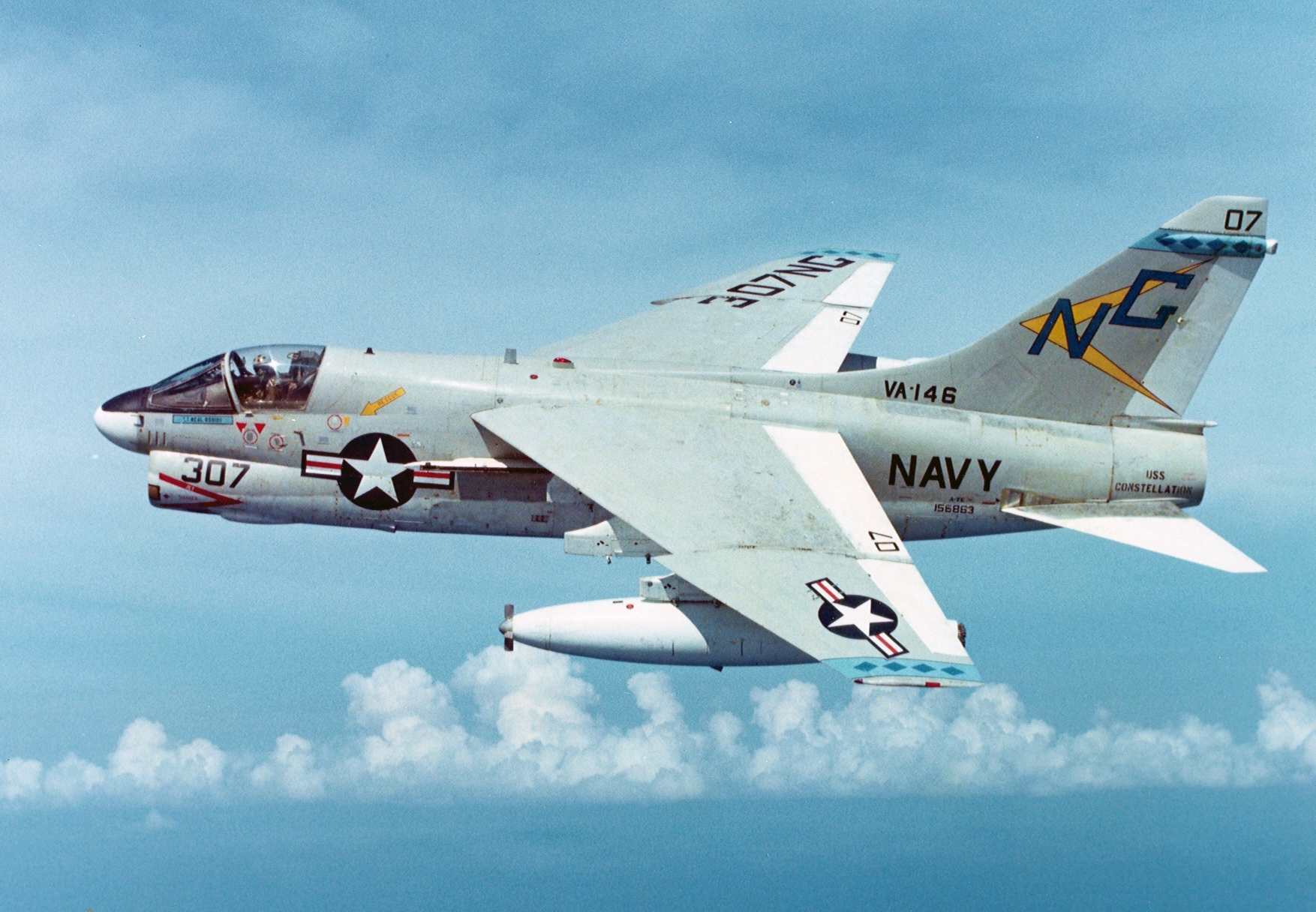
- United States Navy A-7E from VA-146

General information
- Type: Attack aircraft
- National origin: United States
- Manufacturer: Ling-Temco-Vought
- Status: Retired
- Primary users: United States Navy (historical) United States Air Force (historical); Portuguese Air Force (historical); Hellenic Air Force (historical)
- Number built: 1,545

History
- Manufactured: 1965–1984
- Introduction date: 1 February 1967
- First flight: 26 September 1965
- Retired: 1991 (USN, USAF), 1993 (ANG); 1999 (Portuguese Air Force); 2014 (Hellenic Air Force)
- Developed from: Vought F-8 Crusader
- Variants: LTV A-7P Corsair II; Vought YA-7F

The LTV A-7 Corsair II is an American carrier-capable subsonic light attack aircraft designed and manufactured by Ling-Temco-Vought (LTV).

The A-7 was developed during the early 1960s as replacement for the Douglas A-4 Skyhawk. Its design was derived from the Vought F-8 Crusader; in comparison with the F-8, the A-7 is both smaller and restricted to subsonic speeds, its airframe being simpler and cheaper to produce. Following a competitive bid by Vought in response to the United States Navy's (USN) VAL (Heavier-than-air, Attack, Light) requirement, an initial contract for the type was issued on 8 February 1964. Development was rapid, first flying on 26 September 1965 and entering squadron service with the USN on 1 February 1967. By the end of that year, A-7s were being deployed overseas for the Vietnam War.

Initially adopted by USN, the A-7 proved attractive to other services, soon being adopted by the United States Air Force (USAF) and the Air National Guard (ANG) to replace their aging Douglas A-1 Skyraider and North American F-100 Super Sabre fleets. Improved models of the A-7 would be developed, typically adopting more powerful engines and increasingly capable avionics. American A-7s would be used in various major conflicts, including the Invasion of Grenada, Operation El Dorado Canyon, and the Gulf War. The type was also used to support the development of the Lockheed F-117 Nighthawk.

The A-7 was also exported to Greece in the 1970s and to Portugal in the late 1980s. The USAF and USN opted to retire their remaining examples of the type in 1991, followed by the ANG in 1993 and the Portuguese Air Force in 1999. The A-7 was largely replaced by newer generation fighters such as the General Dynamics F-16 Fighting Falcon and the McDonnell Douglas F/A-18 Hornet. The final operator, the Hellenic Air Force, withdrew the last A-7s during 2014.

== Development ==
=== Origins ===
In 1960, officials within the United States Navy (USN) began to consider the need to replace its existing fleet of Douglas A-4 Skyhawk, a light attack aircraft. At that time, it was not clear that the A-4 would eventually remain in production until 1979; furthermore, according to aviation authors Bill Gunston and Peter Gilchrist, some figures believed there to be an unmet requirement for a more capable attack platform that could routinely attain supersonic speeds, carry heavier payloads, and fly further than its predecessors. Proponents of a new attack aircraft included Secretary of Defense Robert McNamara, who urged the Navy's consideration on the matter.

In December 1962, the Sea-Based Air Strike Forces (SBASF) study group started examining detailed performance and cost evaluations on the topic. The group analyzed a total of 144 hypothetical aircraft to support their findings. According to Gunston and Gilchrist, a major finding from these studies was that a subsonic aircraft would achieve superior performance to a supersonic one. By foregoing a supersonic capability, the airframe could be smaller, cheaper, and easier to manufacture; considerably larger quantities of such an attack platform could be procured over a supersonic counterpart. Development speed was also increased by sticking to subsonic speeds, which was a further advantage. A particular emphasis was placed on the accurate delivery of weapons, which would reduce the munitions costs per target.

On 17 May 1963, these criteria were formulated into a draft requirement, known as VAL (Heavier-than-air, Attack, Light). On 29 May 1963, the request for proposals (RFP) associated with the requirement was issued. To minimize costs, all proposals had to be based on existing designs. Accordingly, Vought, Douglas Aircraft, Grumman and North American Aviation chose to respond. The Vought proposal was based on their successful F-8 Crusader fighter and sharing a similar configuration; however, it had a shorter airframe with a rounded nose, giving the aircraft a "stubbier" appearance.

All bids were received by September 1963 and the evaluation process was completed in early November of that year. On 8 February 1964, funding for VAL was approved by Congress, enabling the programme to proceed; three days later, Vought's submission was selected as the winner. On 19 March 1964, Vought received a contract from the Navy for the manufacture of the initial batch of aircraft, designated A-7. On 22 June 1964, the mock-up review took place. In 1965, the A-7 received the name Corsair II; Vought had previously produced three aircraft known as "Corsair". During the 1920s, they had produced the O2U Corsair biplane scout and observation aircraft and the SBU Corsair scout bomber of the 1930s. During World War II, the firm made the successful F4U Corsair. The name Corsair II reflects the well-known F4U Corsair, which famously served as a capable fighter bomber in World War II and the Korean War. It was supposed to establish a lineage between the aircraft from the same manufacturer and intended for the same ground attack role.

=== Into production ===
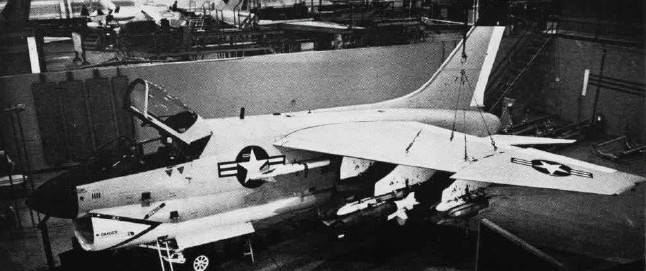
The first A-7 mock-up in 1964

On 27 September 1965, the first A-7A performed the type's maiden flight. On 2 November 1965, Vought publicly demonstrated the first pair of A-7As to 1,000 guests; test pilot John Conrad demonstrated the aircraft's ability to perform rapid rolls even while laden with a payload of six 250 lb (110 kg) and twelve 500 lb (230 kg) bombs. A Navy spokesperson acknowledged the A-7's ability to carry double the bombload of an A-4E, or the same payload over twice its maximum distance.

The flight test program proceeded at a relatively rapid pace, during which no major setbacks were uncovered or meaningful delays were incurred. According to Gunston and Gilchrist, there were some naval officials that sought to slow the program down so that the A-7's avionics systems could be revised for greater capabilities, but this preference had been overridden by a perceived urgency to getting the type into service. On 14 October 1966, enough aircraft had been delivered to the Navy that the first squadron could be formed. The first A-7 squadrons attained operational status on 1 February 1967; these were able to commence overseas combat operations in the escalating Vietnam War during December of that year.

The June 1964 contract had ordered the completion of seven development aircraft and 35 production-standard fighter bombers. A follow-up contract, placed during September 1965, ordered 140 more aircraft. A third contract for 17 aircraft led to a total of 199 A-7A aircraft being manufactured. As the original version was found to be underpowered, a large order for 196 aircraft of the improved A-7B variant, equipped with the more powerful Pratt & Whitney TF30-8 engine, was placed. Further variants of the type would be ordered, including the A-7D for the United States Air Force (USAF), during 1966. Partially due to a shortage of engines, the Allison TF41-A-2, a licensed derivative of the Rolls-Royce Spey engine, powered the A-7D. The adoption of a British engine caused some political controversy on both sides of the Atlantic.

=== Further development ===
==== United States Air Force A-7D ====
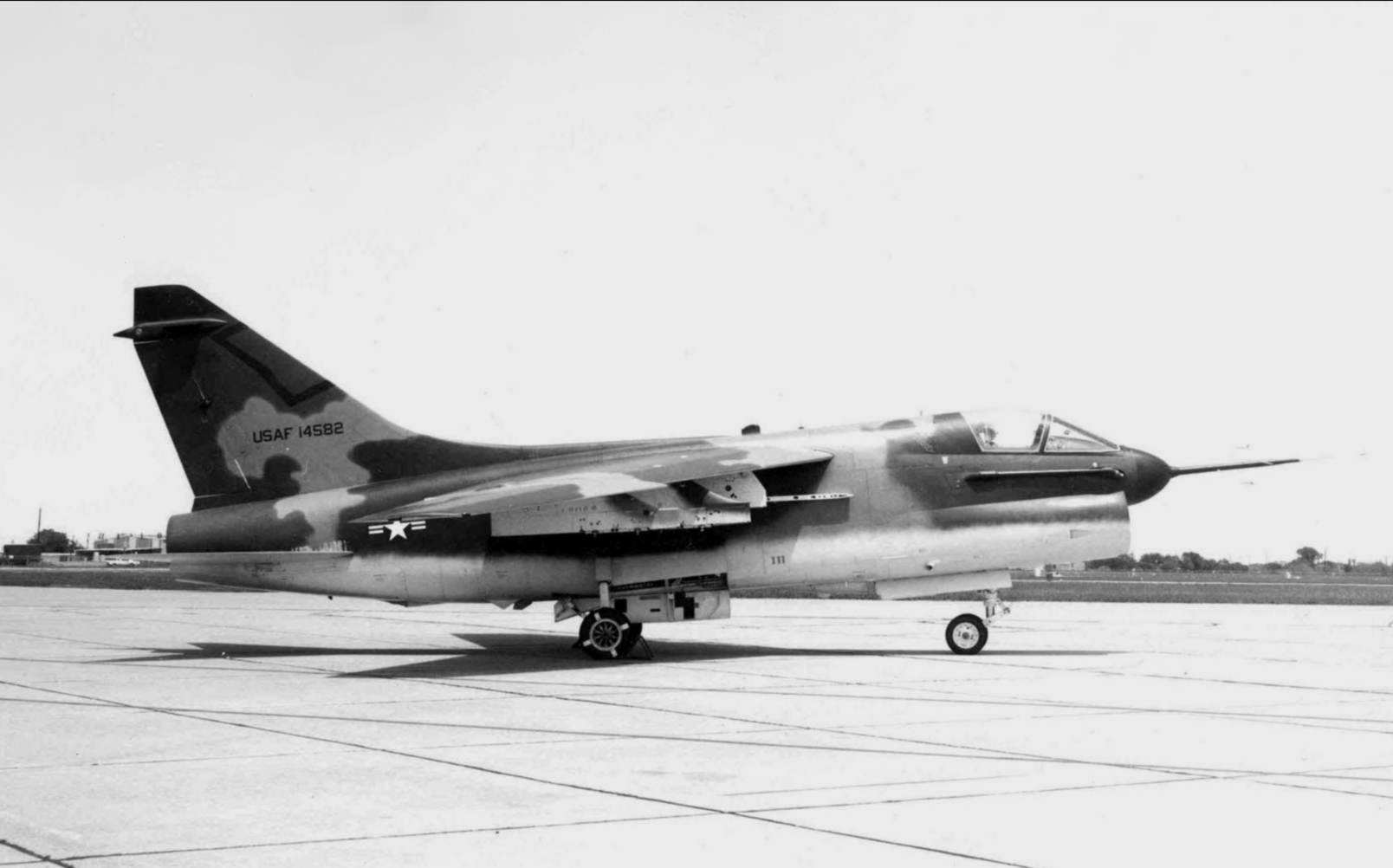
YA-7D-1-CV AF Serial No. 67-14582, the first USAF YA-7D, 2 May 1968. Note the Navy-style refueling probe (retracted beside the cockpit in the standard position, not the air test data probe on the nose cone, which is part of the flight testing equipment) and the modified Navy Bureau Number used as its USAF tail number.

The United States Army has not been permitted to operate fixed-wing combat aircraft since the establishment of an independent United States Air Force (USAF) in 1947. To meet its need for close air support of its troops in South Vietnam, the Army pressured the Air Force to procure a specialized subsonic close air support fixed-wing aircraft that would suit its needs better than the general-purpose supersonic aircraft that the USAF preferred.

The Vought A-7 seemed to be a relatively quick and inexpensive way to satisfy this need. However, the USAF was initially reluctant to take on yet another Navy-designed aircraft, but Secretary of Defense Robert McNamara was insistent. On 5 November 1965, Secretary of the Air Force Harold Brown and USAF Chief of Staff General John P. McConnell announced that they had decided to order a version of the Corsair II, designated A-7D, for the Tactical Air Command.

The A-7D differed from the Navy's Corsair II in several ways. For one, the USAF insisted on significantly more power for its Corsair II version, and it selected the Allison TF41-A-1 turbofan engine, which was a license-built version of the Rolls-Royce Spey. It offered a thrust of 14,500 lbf (64,000 N), over 2,000 lbf (8,900 N) greater than that of the TF30 that powered the Navy's Corsair IIs. Other changes included a head up display, a new avionics package, and an M61A1 rotary cannon in place of the two single-barreled 20-mm cannon. Also included was a computerized navigation/weapons delivery system with AN/APQ-126 radar and a head-up display.

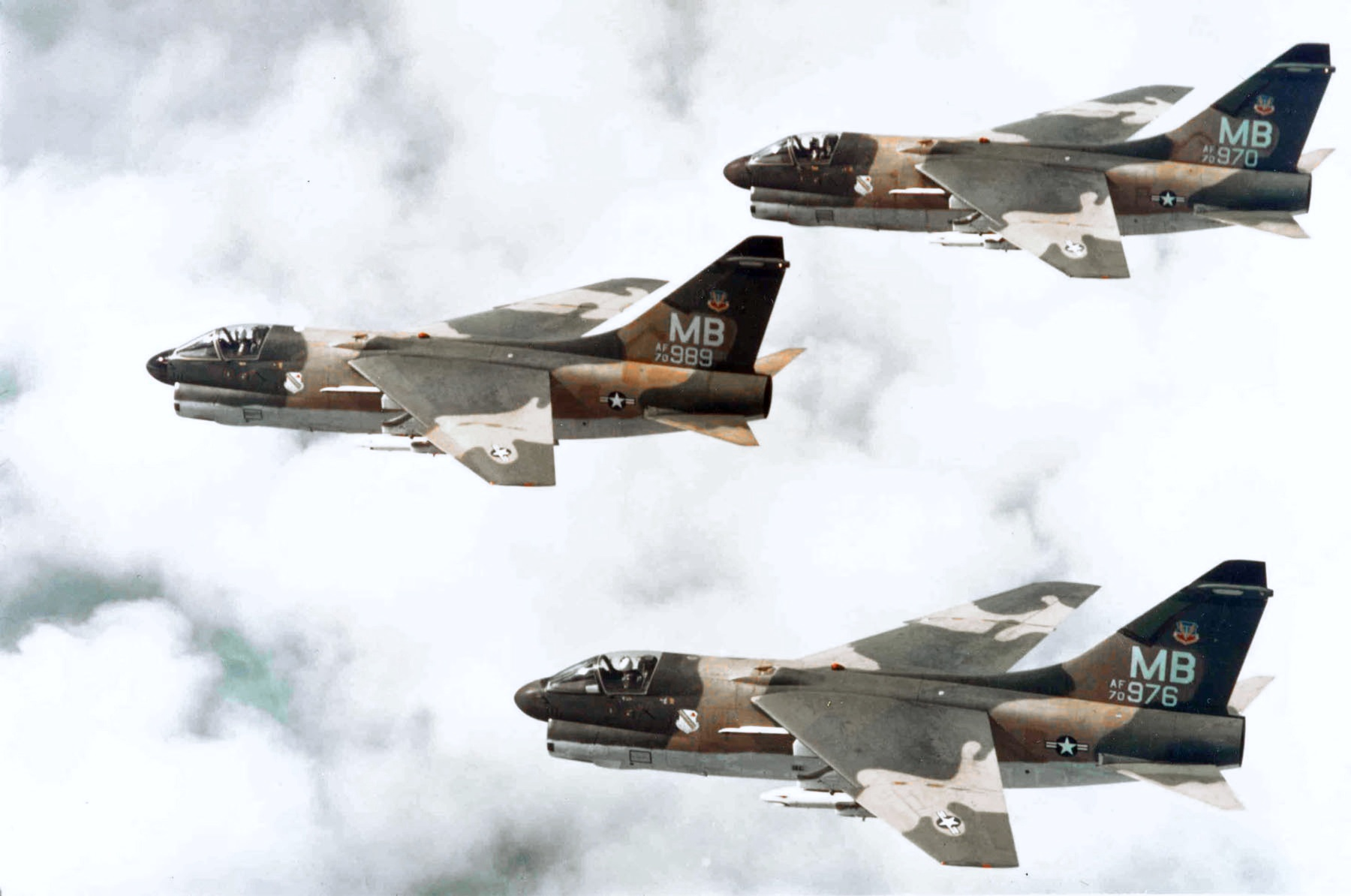
A-7D-7-CV Corsair IIs 70-0976, 70-0989 and 70-0970 of the 354th Tactical Fighter Wing in the skies over Southeast Asia. '976 and '989 were retired to AMARC in 1992, '970 is on permanent display at the National Museum of the United States Air Force, Wright-Patterson AFB, Ohio.

Two YA-7D prototypes were completed with TF30-P-6 engines, and the first of these flew on 6 April 1968. The first Spey-powered A-7D (67-14854) flew for the first time on 26 September 1968. The seventeenth production aircraft introduced a provision for boom flight refueling in place of the Navy's retractable starboard-side probe/drogue system, with the boom receptacle being on the top of the fuselage behind the cockpit and offset to port.

==== Improved A-7E ====
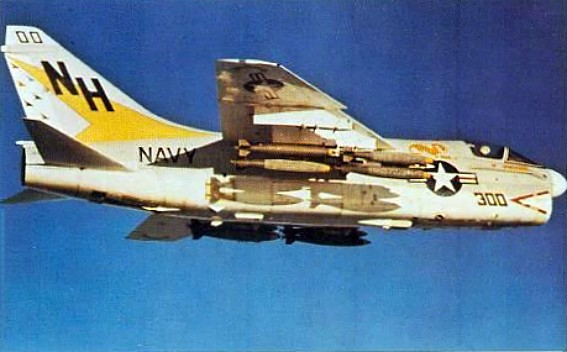
A VA-192 A-7E over Vietnam. This aircraft was lost on 2 November 1972.

The Navy was sufficiently impressed with the increased power offered by the A-7D Spey engine used by the Air Force, and decided to use this engine for its own version of the Corsair II. The designation A-7E was assigned, and this version was to succeed the A-7B in production. However, there were delays in the deliveries of the TF41-A-2 engine specified for the A-7E, so the first 67 aircraft of the order were delivered with the TF30-P-8 engine. These aircraft had all of the other improvements planned for the A-7E, including the improved avionics and the M61 rotary cannon, and were re-designated A-7C after delivery.

During 1967, the Navy decided to cancel its order for the A-7B, resulting in 257 aircraft less of this variant being constructed. Taking its place, the A-7E, the definitive model of the aircraft, was specified and placed into production. This variant integrated several of the improvements of the USAF's A-7D, including the TF41 engine and much of its avionics; however, the engine was revised for slightly more thrust and the communications modified for compatibility with naval systems. On 25 November 1968, the first A-7E conducted its first flight; a total of 535 aircraft of this variant would be manufactured. During the 1970s and 1980s, several specialised models, such as the TA-7C for training and EA-7L for electronic warfare, were developed as well. During 1983, the final delivery of a new-build A-7 took place.

== Design ==
The LTV A-7 Corsair II was a carrier-capable subsonic attack fighter. It was a derivative of the Vought F-8 Crusader, an earlier fighter; compared to the Crusader, it had a shorter, broader fuselage, and a longer-span wing but without the Crusader's variable-incidence feature. The A-7's wing was not only larger but had reduced sweepback, as well as six pylons with the carriage of up to 15,000 lb (6,800 kg) of bombs or other equipment. According to Gunston and Gilchrist, there were no common structural features shared between the two aircraft despite their visual similarity and shared heritage.

The A-7 had fully powered flight controls, as did the F-8. However, conventional outboard ailerons were used (instead of the drooping ailerons mounted inboard of the wing-fold of the F-8 and doubling as flaps when flaps were deployed), along with large slotted flaps on the wing's inboard area; the wing fold was between the flaps and ailerons. The wing leading edge was fixed and had a dog-tooth discontinuity. A large air brake was fitted on the underside of the aircraft. The three-unit landing gear retracted into the fuselage; the twin-wheel nose gear was steerable and stressed for catapult-assisted take-offs.

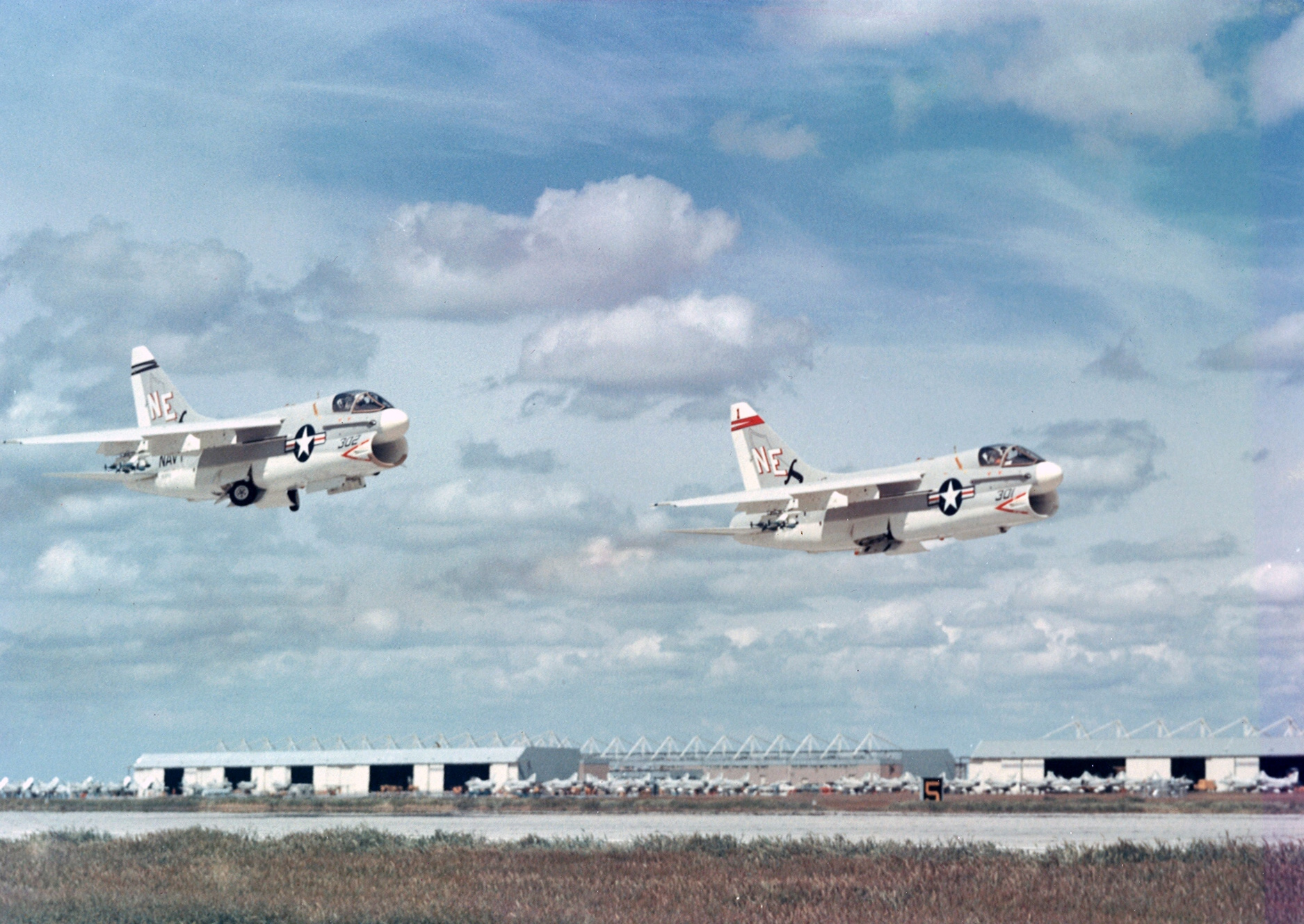
VA-147 was the first operational U.S. Navy A-7 squadron, beginning in 1967.

To achieve the required range, initial versions of the A-7 were powered by a single Pratt & Whitney TF30-P-6 turbofan engine, which produced 11,350 lbf (50.5 kN) of thrust. It had replaced the afterburner-equipped Pratt & Whitney J57-P-20A turbojet engine of the F-8. The same engine had also powered several other combat aircraft of the era, including the General Dynamics F-111 Aardvark and early Grumman F-14 Tomcats. The TF30-P-6 did not require an afterburner for its subsonic role.

Later versions of the A-7 used different engines; according to Gunston and Gilchrist, this was largely due to production difficulties in keeping up with numerous military and civil demands. These new powerplants included the more powerful Pratt & Whitney TF30-8 and the Allison TF41-A-2 engines, a licensed model of the Rolls-Royce Spey engine. The TF41 corrected issues that had troubled initial A-7 operations, such as severe compressor stalls and low thrust. The Air Force A-7D had self-contained starting using internal batteries and a gas turbine starter. The Navy A-7E used an air turbine starter driven by an external air supply.

Air was fed to the engine through ducting from a simple nose inlet, similar to that on the F-8, despite the potential hazard it posed to flight deck personnel. An aerial refueling probe was mounted on the righthand side of the nose. Two cannons were installed on the underside of the nose. For self-defense against aerial threats, the A-7, in addition to the cannons, had a mounting for AIM-9 Sidewinder air-to-air missiles on either side of the fuselage. Later variants had the two cannons replaced with a single M61A1 Vulcan rotary cannon, along with other improvements. To reduce vulnerability to ground fire the flying control hydraulic systems were triplicated, other systems duplicated and much of the fuselage had armor protection.

The A-7 was fitted with an AN/APQ-116 radar, later followed by the AN/APQ-126, which was integrated into the ILAAS digital navigation system. The radar also fed an IBM navigation and weapons delivery computer which made possible accurate delivery of bombs from a greater stand-off distance, greatly improving survivability compared with faster aircraft such as the McDonnell Douglas F-4 Phantom II. It was the first U.S. aircraft to have a modern head-up display, (made by Marconi-Elliott), now a standard instrument, which displayed information such as dive angle, airspeed, altitude, drift and aiming reticule. The integrated navigation system also had another innovation—the projected map display system (PMDS) which accurately showed aircraft position on two different map scales.

The A-7 had more modern avionics and systems than contemporary aircraft. This included data link capabilities that, among others, provided "hands-off" carrier landing capability when used with its approach power compensator (APC) or auto throttle. Other notable and advanced equipment was a projected map display located just below the radar scope. The map display was slaved to the inertial navigation system and provided a high-resolution map image of the aircraft's position superimposed over TPC/JNC charts. Moreover, when slaved to the all-axis auto pilot, the inertial navigation system could fly the aircraft "hands off" to up to nine individual waypoints. Typical inertial drift was minimal for newly manufactured models and the inertial measurement system accepted flyover, radar, and TACAN updates.

== Operational history ==
=== Introduction and early operations ===
Initial operational basing/homeporting for USN A-7 squadrons was at NAS Cecil Field, Florida for Atlantic Fleet units and NAS Lemoore, California for Pacific Fleet units. This was in keeping with the role of these bases in already hosting the A-4 Skyhawk attack squadrons that would eventually transition to the A-7.

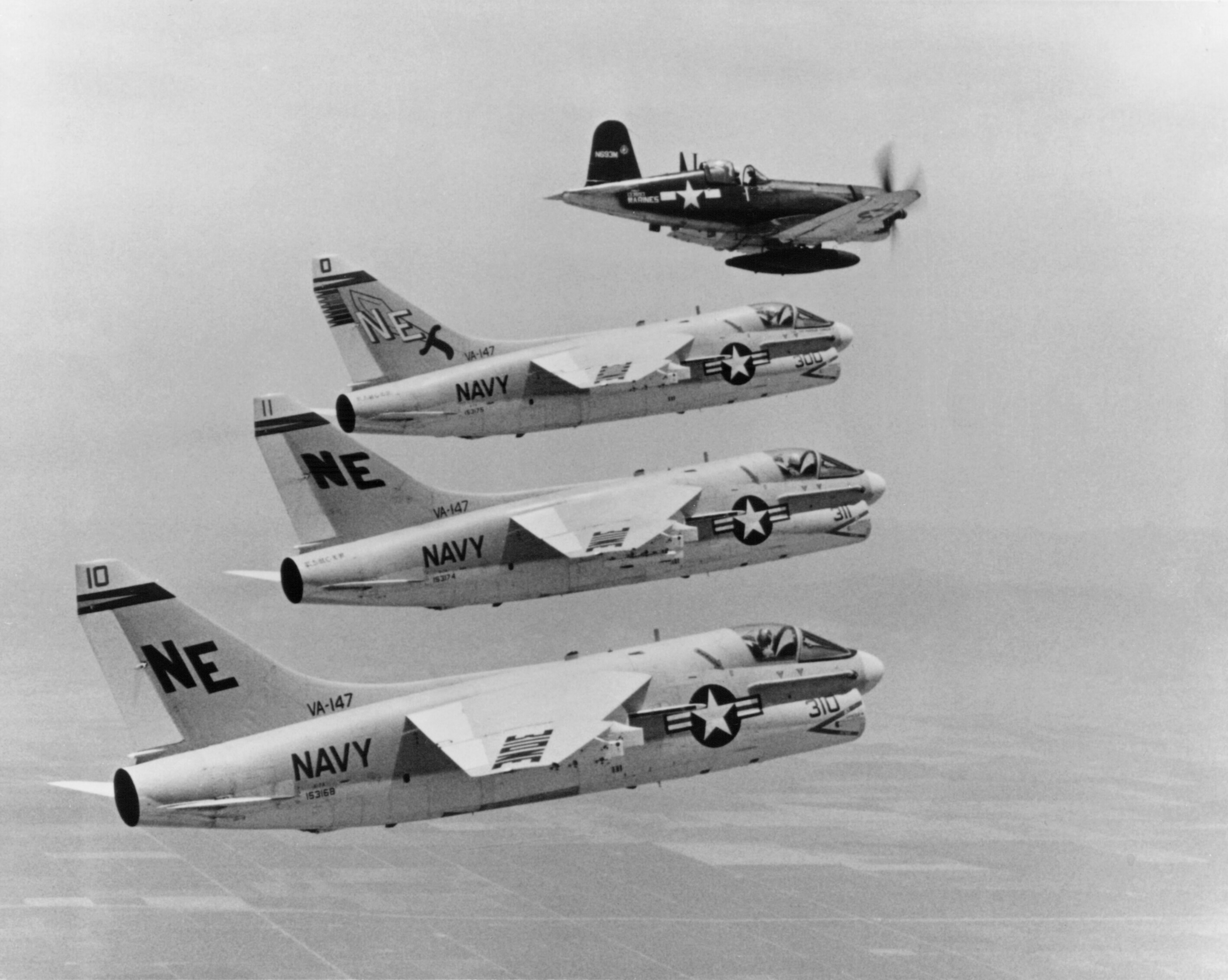
Lynn Garrison in a Chance Vought F4U-7 Corsair leads A-7 Corsair IIs of VA-147, over NAS Lemoore, California on 7 July 1967 prior to the A-7's first deployment to Vietnam on USS Ranger. The A-7A "NE-300" is the aircraft of the Air Group Commander (CAG) of Attack Carrier Air Wing 2 (CVW-2).

From 1967 to 1971, a total of 27 US Navy squadrons took delivery of four different A-7A/B/C/E models. The Vought plant in Dallas, Texas, employed up to 35,000 workers who turned out one aircraft a day for several years to support the navy's carrier-based needs for Vietnam and SE Asia and commitments to NATO in Europe. In 1974, when USS Midway became the first aircraft carrier to be homeported in Yokosuka, Japan, two A-7A squadrons assigned to Carrier Air Wing Five (CVW-5) were moved to NAF Atsugi, Japan. In 1976, these squadrons (VA-93 and VA-56) finally transitioned to the much more advanced A-7E model. Six Naval Reserve attack squadrons would also eventually transition to the A-7, operating from NAS Cecil Field, Florida; NAS Atlanta/Dobbins ARB, Georgia; NAS New Orleans, Louisiana; NAS Alameda, California and NAS Point Mugu, California. An additional active duty squadron stood up in the 1980s, Tactical Electronic Warfare Squadron 34 (VAQ-34) at NAS Point Mugu, operating twin-seat TA-7C and EA-7L aircraft with both a pilot and a naval flight officer in an adversary electronic warfare role.

Pilots of the early A-7s lauded the aircraft for general ease of flying (with the exceptions of poor stability on crosswind landings and miserable stopping performance on wet runways with an inoperative anti-skid braking system) and excellent forward visibility but noted a lack of engine thrust. This was addressed with A-7B and more thoroughly with A-7D/E. The turbofan engine provided a dramatic increase in fuel efficiency compared with earlier turbojets—the A-7D was said to have specific fuel consumption one sixth that of an F-100 Super Sabre at equivalent thrust. An A-7D carrying twelve 500 lb (230 kg) bombs at 480 mph (770 km/h) at 33,000 ft (10,000 m) used only 3,350 lb (1,520 kg) of fuel per hour. Typical fuel consumption at mission retrograde during aircraft carrier recovery was approximately 30 pounds per minute (14 kg/min) compared to over 100 pounds per minute (45 kg/min) for the Phantom F-4J/N series. The A-7 Corsair II was tagged with the nickname "SLUF" ("Short Little Ugly Fucker") by pilots.

=== Southeast Asia use ===
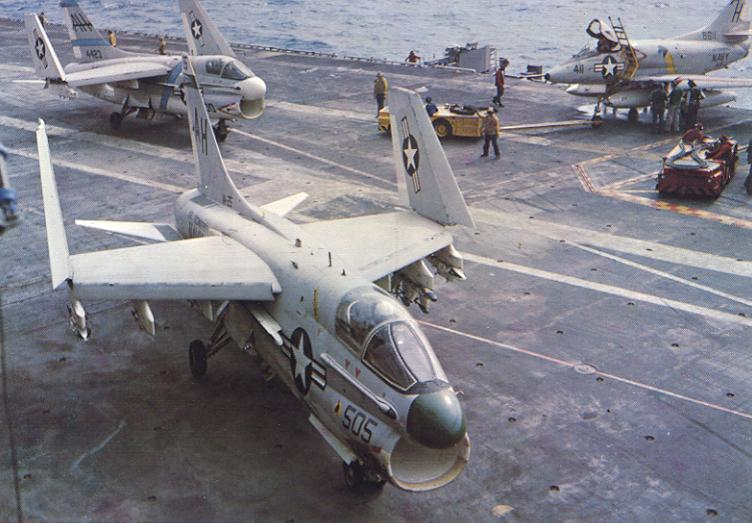
A-7Bs of CVW-16 on USS Ticonderoga in 1968

The A-7D first entered service in 1970 with the 57th Fighter Weapons Wing at Luke AFB Arizona, and the 354th Tactical Fighter Wing at Myrtle Beach AFB, South Carolina was equipped with four squadrons of A-7Ds by 1972; the 355th TFW at Davis-Monthan AFB was equipped with four squadrons in 1972, and in 1973, the 23d TFW at England AFB, Louisiana was fully equipped with A-7Ds.

The 354th TFW first deployed two squadrons of A-7Ds to Korat Royal Thai AFB, Thailand in September 1972 as part of Operation Cornet Dancer, The A-7Ds were quickly assigned the "Sandy mission" of providing air cover for Combat Search and Rescue missions of downed pilots. Taking over from Douglas A-1 Skyraiders (and adopting their call sign of "Sandy"), the A-7's higher speed was somewhat detrimental for escorting the helicopters but the aircraft's high endurance and durability were an asset and it performed admirably.

On 18 November 1972, Major Colin A. Clarke led a successful CSAR mission near Thanh Hoa to rescue a downed Republic F-105 Thunderchief crew. The mission lasted a total of 8.8 hours during which Clarke and his wingman took a number of hits from 0.50 cal (12.7 mm) anti-aircraft fire. For his actions in coordinating the rescue, Clarke was awarded the Air Force Cross, the USAF's second-highest decoration for valor, and his A-7D (AF Serial No. 70-0970) was eventually placed on display on 31 January 1992 at the National Museum of the United States Air Force at Wright-Patterson AFB, Ohio.

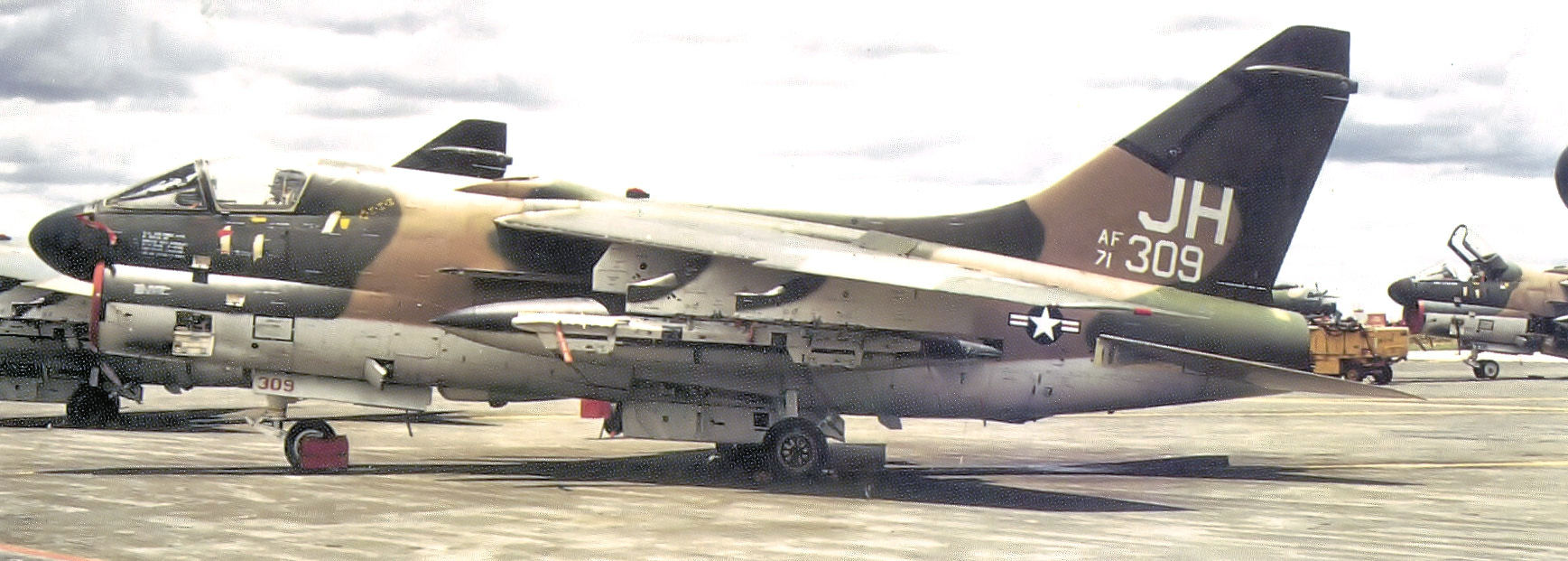
3d TFS A-7D-10-CV Corsair II 71-0309 at Korat Royal Thai Air Force Base, 1973

With the end of US involvement in South Vietnam, the 354th TFW, deployed at Korat, began flying combat sorties in Cambodia to support the Lon Nol government in support of Khmer National Armed Forces against the Khmer Rouge. Rotational deployments began to Korat from the 355th TFW and 23d TFW, with pilots and support personnel beginning six-month deployment cycles. In March 1973, the 354th transferred a squadron of A-7Ds to the 388th TFW, the host wing at Korat RTAFB at the time, which re-established the 3d Tactical Fighter Squadron and created a permanent USAF A-7D presence in Southeast Asia. A-7Ds from both wings stationed at Korat engaged in combat operations in Cambodia until 15 August 1973 when an A-7D of the deployed 353d TFS/354th TFW carried out the last air support mission. In March 1974, the 354th TFW transferred several more aircraft to the 3d TFS prior to its return to Myrtle Beach AFB.

The USAF A-7D flew a total of 12,928 combat sorties during the war with only six losses—the lowest of any U.S. fighter in the theater. The aircraft was second only to Boeing B-52 Stratofortress in the amount of ordnance dropped on Hanoi and dropped more bombs per sortie with greater accuracy than any other U.S. attack aircraft.

A-7 Familiarization (1970) de-classified official US Navy training film reel.

In Vietnam, the hot, humid air robbed all jet engines of power, and even the upgraded A-7D and A-7E fell short of their required power levels when serving in these conditions. Takeoff rolls were lengthy, and fully armed aircraft struggled to reach 500 mph (800 km/h). For A-7A aircraft, high-density altitude and maximum-weight runway takeoffs often necessitated a "low transition", where the aircraft was intentionally held in "ground effect" a few feet off the runway during gear retraction, and as much as a 10 mi (16 km) departure at treetop altitude before reaching a safe flap-retraction speed. (A-7A wing flap systems were either fully extended or fully retracted. The A-7A flap handle did not have the microswitch feature of later models that permitted the flaps to be slowly raised by several degrees per tap of the flap handle as airspeed slowly increased during max-weight takeoffs.)

Carrier catapult launches at maximum weight under these performance-robbing conditions were not significantly better and were characterized by the aircraft decelerating by as much as 20 knots (37 km/h) immediately after launch. As a result, A-7A units operated their aircraft 4,000 pounds (1,800 kg) below the rated maximum takeoff weight for the A-7E.

In a sortie against the Thanh Hóa Bridge on 6 October 1972, four A-7Cs from VA-82 successfully delivered 8,000 lb of high explosives with two aircraft carrying two 2,000 lb (910 kg) Walleyes, while two others also carried 2,000 lb in Mk 84 GP bombs. In a simultaneous attack, the center piling on the bridge's west side was hit and broke the span in half. After this, the Thanh Hoa bridge was considered permanently destroyed and removed from the target list.

The Spey-powered A-7E entered service in Southeast Asia in May 1970 with VA-146 and VA-147 deployed aboard USS America. The A-7E participated in numerous close-air support missions over both North and South Vietnam, with its state-of-the-art bombing and navigation system being particularly reliable and accurate. Most air wings operating A-4 Skyhawks and early A-7s were re-equipped with A-7Es. The A-7E participated in the mining of Haiphong harbor in 1972, and played a vital role in Operations Linebacker I and Linebacker II that led up to the formal end of US involvement in the Vietnam War on 24 January 1973.

On 15 May 1975, A-7E aircraft operating from USS Coral Sea, in conjunction with A-7D aircraft assigned to the 3d TFS at Korat RTAFB, provided air cover in what is considered the last battle of the Vietnam War, the recovery of SS Mayagüez after it was hijacked by Khmer Rouge gunboats.

A total of 98 USN A-7 Corsairs were lost during the war.

=== Post-Vietnam era ===
==== Air National Guard ====
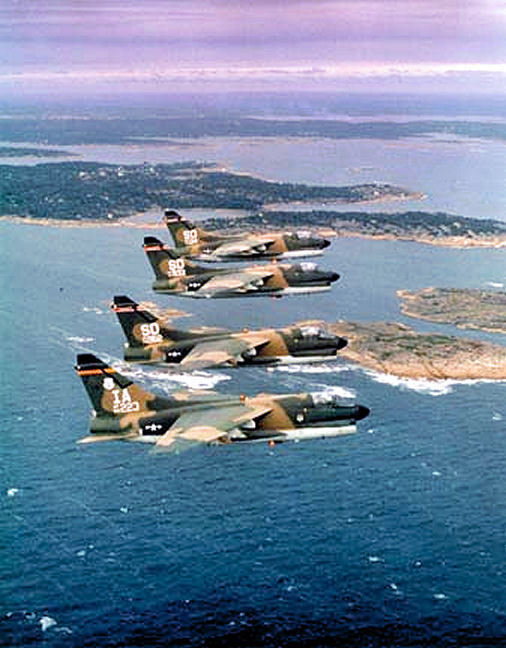
A-7 Corsair II of the Iowa (IA) and South Dakota (SD) Air National Guard

With the pullout of the USAF from its Thailand bases in late 1975, the A-7Ds stationed at Korat initially went to Clark AB, Philippines. The 3d TFS transitioned from its Corsairs to the F-4E Phantom II and remained at Clark. The A-7Ds were returned to the United States where they were reassigned to several Air National Guard squadrons.

With the end of the Vietnam War, the Air Force began to transfer its active duty A-7D aircraft to Air National Guard units beginning in 1974. The Corsairs had been, in a sense, a forced acquisition by the USAF in the late 1960s, and the inter-service rivalry of flying a Navy aircraft had led, beginning about 1970, to the development of its own Close Air Support aircraft. In 1974, selection of the Fairchild Republic A-10 Thunderbolt II was made as the replacement for the A-7D. The first A-10As were received by the 354th TFW in 1977 at Myrtle Beach AFB; the 355th TFW at Davis-Monthan AFB began replacing its A-7Ds in 1978, and the 23d TFW at England AFB in 1979. As the A-10s were received, the A-7Ds were transferred from the USAF to the National Guard Bureau for subsequent re-allocation. By 1981, when the 23d TFW sent its last A-7Ds to Tonopah Test Range Airport, Nevada for clandestine use in the Lockheed F-117 Nighthawk development program, fifteen ANG squadrons were equipped with the A-7D Corsair II.

However, Congressional decisions added additional funding to the DOD FY 1975 and FY 1976 budgets for the procurement of additional A-7Ds, primarily to keep the LTV production line in Dallas open and the workers employed in the wake of post-Vietnam DOD procurement reductions. As a result of these unplanned acquisitions, the Air Force assigned these new aircraft (all with 1975 tail numbers) to the Arizona Air National Guard 152nd Tactical Fighter Squadron at Tucson, which operated the Air National Guard transition training school for Corsair II pilots. In 1978, a two-seat A-7 trainer was developed by LTV for the Air Force, designated the A-7K. One prototype aircraft was built by modifying an existing A-7D airframe; however, production A-7Ks were new builds with 1979 and 1980 tail numbers. The A-7K was a fully combat-capable aircraft as well as a dual-control training aircraft. Most of the A-7K trainers went to the transition school at Tucson, with the squadrons' A-7Ds being re-distributed to other ANG squadrons. However, all ANG squadrons were assigned an A-7K trainer as well as their complement of A-7Ds.

During the post-Vietnam era, the Air National Guard frequently deployed its Corsairs on annual operational exercises. Deployments were made to NATO and USAFE bases in West Germany and Denmark as part of training exercises along with the USAREUR Reforger training exercises.

Beginning in 1974, active-duty squadrons from Myrtle Beach, England and Davis-Monthan Air Force Bases began deployments of A-7Ds to Howard AFB, Panama to train with Army and Naval forces defending the Panama Canal. These deployments, named "Coronet Cove" generally were of ninety (90) days, and were rotated among squadrons of the three wings in the United States. Beginning in 1977, with the phaseout of the A-7D with active-duty units, the Air National Guard began taking over this mission. In December 1989, the South Dakota 175th Tactical Fighter Squadron and Ohio 112th Tactical Fighter Squadron were at Howard AFB on a Coronet Cove deployment when President George H. W. Bush announced Operation Just Cause, the United States Invasion of Panama. The ANG squadrons participated in the invasion, flying 34 combat missions, completing 34 sorties, expended 71.7 flying hours and expended 2,715 rounds of ordnance.

In the 1981 Muñiz Air National Guard Base attack, on 12 January, 10 A-7Ds of the 198th Tactical Fighter Squadron, Puerto Rico Air National Guard were destroyed or damaged in a terrorist attack by the Boricua Popular Army at Muñiz Air National Guard Base in the largest attack ever on an American military station since the Vietnam War. This terrorist attack was largely unreported due to the Iran hostage crisis at the time.

==== Grenada and Lebanon ====
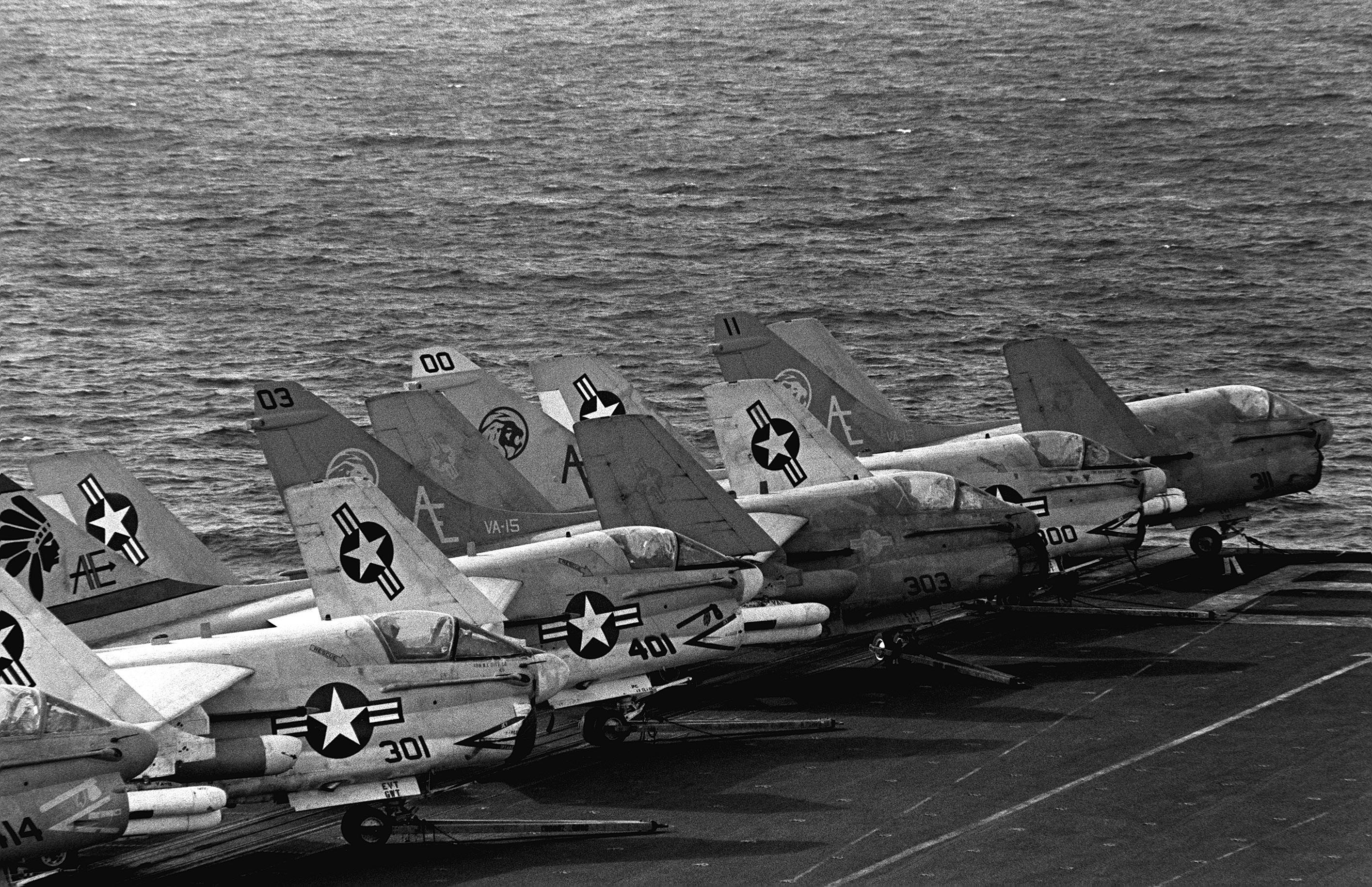
A-7Es on USS Independence in 1983

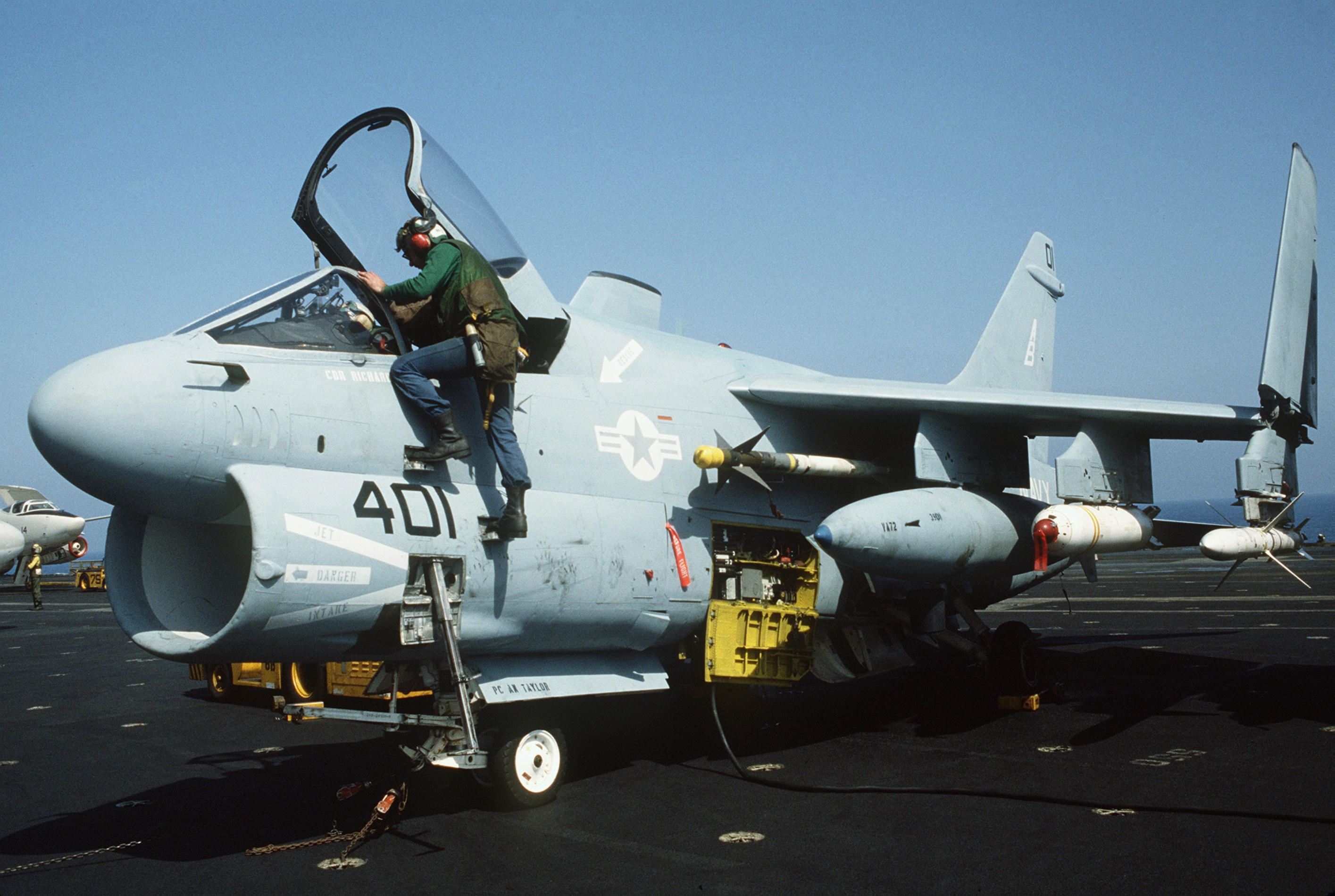
A-7E of VA-72 on USS America off Libya in April 1986.

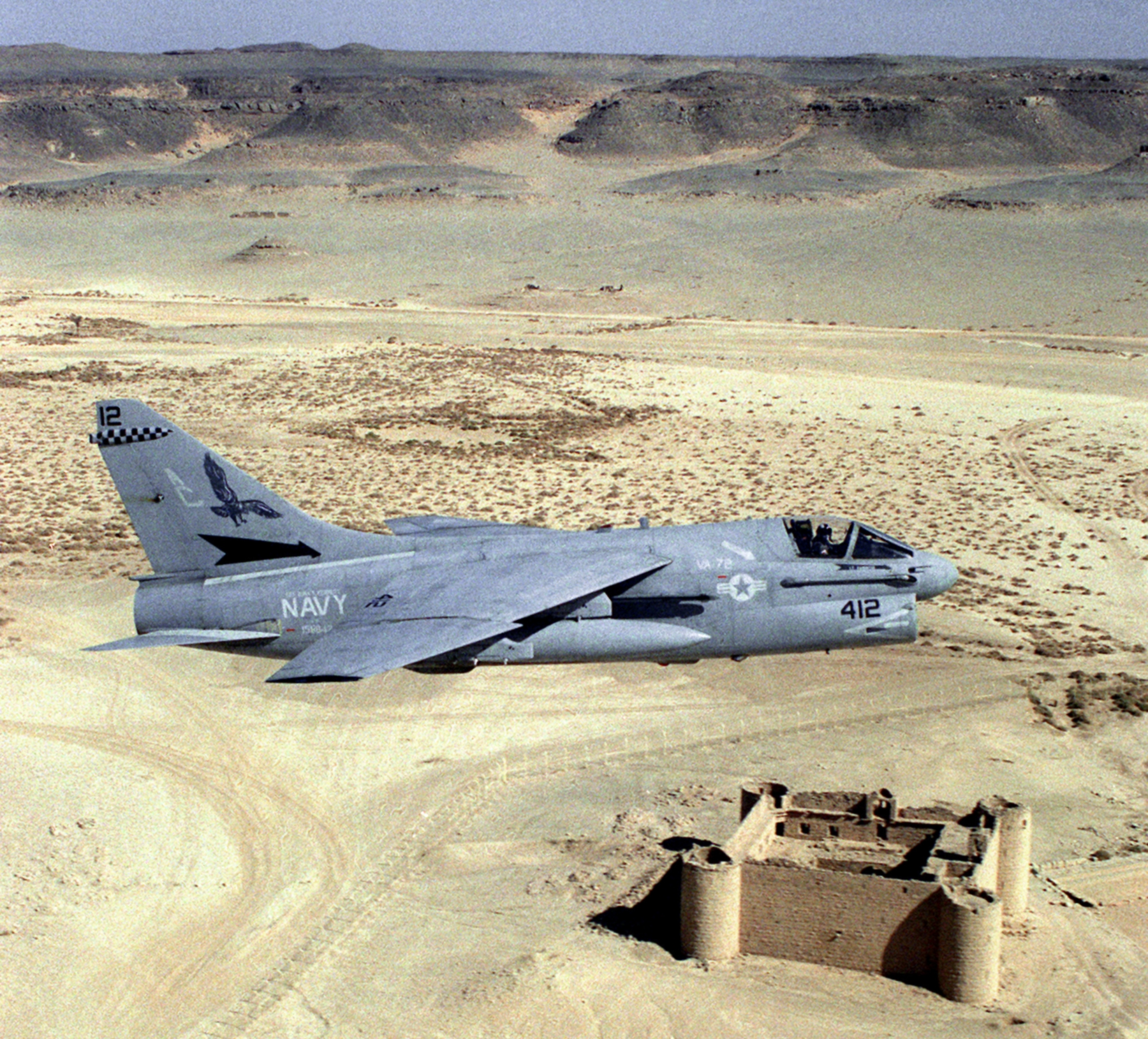
A-7E from VA-72 flying over the Saudi desert during Operation Desert Shield

Navy A-7E squadrons VA-15 and VA-87, from USS Independence, provided close air support during the Invasion of Grenada, codenamed Operation Urgent Fury, in October 1983.

Navy A-7s also provided air support during the U.S. mission in Lebanon in 1983. An A-7 and an A-6 Intruder were shot down by Syrian surface-to-air missiles (SAM) on 4 December 1983. The A-7 pilot, Commander Edward Andrews, managed to guide his failing Corsair over coastal waters before ejecting; he was rescued by a Lebanese fishing boat and safely returned to the U.S. Marines.

==== Libya ====
On 24 March 1986, during the Gulf of Sidra dispute with Libya, Libyan air defense operators launched SA-5 missiles at two Fighter Squadron 102 (VF-102) Grumman F-14 Tomcats from USS America that were orbiting in international air space on a Combat Air Patrol (CAP) station. A-7s operating from USS Saratoga responded by launching the first AGM-88 HARM missiles ever used in combat. On the next day, A-6s attacked Libyan warships approaching the US fleet, while A-7s again launched HARM missiles against Libyan SAM sites.

In April 1986, navy Sixth Fleet A-7Es from VA-72 and VA-46 embarked on board USS America also participated in Operation El Dorado Canyon, the retaliatory attack on Libya, using HARM and Shrike anti-radar missiles to protect the naval strike force from SAMs.

==== Service in operations against Iran ====
A-7Es operated from Nimitz and Coral Sea during Operation Eagle Claw. The A-7s had an orange stripe enclosed by two black stripes for identification. A-7Es operated from multiple U.S. Navy aircraft carriers while providing escort for oil tankers in the Persian Gulf during Operation Earnest Will. A-7Es of VA-22 and VA-94 from the carrier, Enterprise, sank the Iranian frigate Sahand operating alongside VA-95 as part of Operation Praying Mantis.

==== Operations Desert Shield and Desert Storm ====
While USAF A-7s stayed home in favor of A-10s, the USN deployed two of its last A-7E squadrons to Operation Desert Shield in August 1990 aboard USS John F. Kennedy, the only carrier of six deployed to Desert Storm to operate the A-7. The navy squadrons VA-46 and VA-72 made the last combat sorties of the A-7 in Operation Desert Storm flying from the Red Sea to targets throughout Iraq. The A-7 was used both day and night to attack a wide range of heavily defended deep interdiction targets in Iraq as well as "kill boxes" (geographically defined kill zones) in Kuwait, employing a variety of weapons including precision-guided munitions (PGMs), such as the TV-guided Walleye glide bomb, unguided general-purpose bombs, and High Speed Anti-Radiation missiles (HARM). The A-7 was also used as a tanker in numerous in-flight refueling missions.

==== Use in F-117 development ====
The 4450th Tactical Group stationed at Nellis AFB, Nevada had the distinction of being the last active USAF unit to operate the A-7 Corsair II. The mission of the 4450th TG was the operational development of the F-117, and the unit needed a surrogate aircraft for pilot training and practice. A-7Ds and A-7Ks were obtained from various active duty and air national guard squadrons and were assigned initially to the "(P)" or "Provisional" unit of the 4450th Tactical Group, redesignated the 4451st Tactical Squadron in January 1983.

The A-7s were used as a deception and training aircraft by the group between 1981 and 1989. It was selected because it demanded a similar pilot workload expected in the F-117A, was single seat, and many of the F-117A pilots had F-4 or F-111 backgrounds. A-7s were used for pilot training before any F-117As had been delivered, to bring all pilots to a common flight training base line. Later, the A-7s were used as chase planes on F-117A tests and other weapon tests at the Nellis Range.

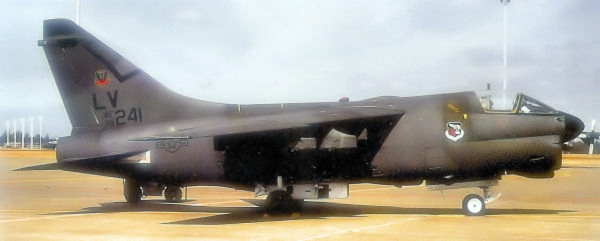
A-7D-5-CV AF Serial No. 69-6241 of the 4451st Test Squadron / 4450th Tactical Group at Nellis AFB, Nevada in 1984

A-7 flight operations began in June 1981 concurrent with the very first YF-117A flights. The A-7s wore a unique "LV" tailcode (for Las Vegas) and had a dark purple/black paint motif. The A-7s were based officially at Nellis Air Force Base and were maintained by the 4450th Maintenance Squadron. In addition to providing an excuse for the 4450th's existence and activities, the A-7s were also used to maintain pilot currency, particularly in the early stages when very few production F-117As were available. The pilots learned to fly chase on F-117A test and training flights, perform practice covert deployments, and practice any other purpose that could not be accomplished using F-117As, given the tight restrictions imposed on all F-117A operations.

Some A-7s operated from the Tonopah Test Range Airport, about 30 miles (48 km) southeast of Tonopah, Nevada where the F-117s were being operationally tested. As a deception operation, care was taken to ensure that F-117As were never left parked outside aircraft hangars during daylight hours. However, A-7s were deliberately and routinely left outside hangars for the benefit of any orbiting Soviet spy satellites. Soviet intelligence agencies examining spy satellite imagery of the base would undoubtedly notice the A-7s parked on the Tonopah flight line, and would not be particularly interested. The intention of this deception was to convince the Soviets that Tonopah operated nothing more exciting than some obsolete A-7 Corsairs. The cover story to the public was that the A-7s were flying "radar calibration missions" out of Tonopah. Also, in order to help maintain the deception, about five or six A-7Ds were deployed to South Korea in 1984 and 1988. In South Korea they trained with the Army for about a month in Close Air Support operations. It appeared to the Soviets that it was a real squadron with a combat mission because the aircraft could be seen having munitions loaded and performing training missions.

There were approximately 20 A-7D aircraft used in developing the F-117, including several two-seat A-7K trainers. In January 1989, three months after the USAF admitted the F-117A existed, the A-7s were retired to the Aerospace Maintenance and Regeneration Center (AMARC) and were replaced by AT-38B Talons as training aircraft and the 4451st TS was deactivated.

=== Training, retirement and foreign users ===
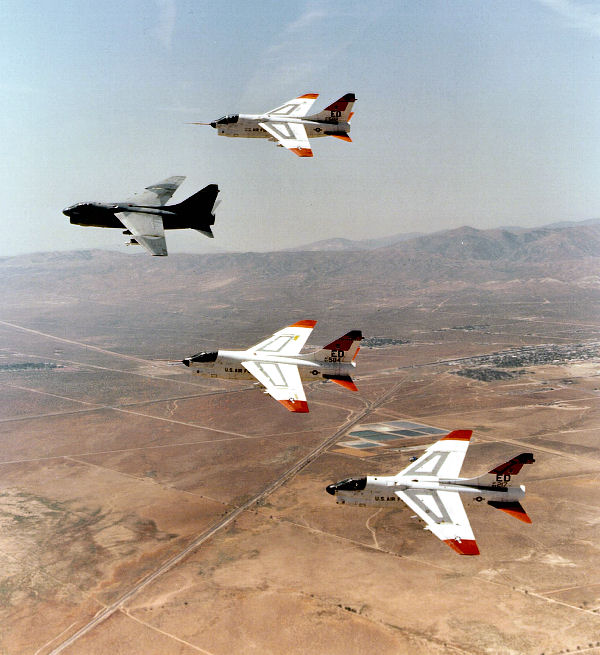
Prototype YA-7Ds 67-14582 and 67-14584, along with 69-6191 and 69-6217 making last flyover retirement formation over Edwards AFB, California, heading to AMARC, August 1992

Pilots quipped that the Corsair "is not very fast, but it sure is slow." For dissimilar air combat training, and aerial demonstrations by the Blue Angels, the Navy would choose the more nimble A-4 Skyhawk as a subsonic maneuvering platform, as some considered the A-7 to be inadequate in air combat, even though it was highly maneuverable. While some questioned its air combat capability it was widely regarded as a highly successful attack aircraft, partly by virtue of being a stable bombing platform. Despite this, the Marine Corps also rejected the Corsair, opting instead for the V/STOL (Vertical/Short Take Off or Landing) AV-8 Harrier as its light attack aircraft to replace its A-4F/M Skyhawks.

Greece's Hellenic Air Force ordered sixty new A-7H aircraft and five TA-7Hs in 1974. The delivery of the airplanes started in 1975 and equipped the 347, 340, and 345 Squadrons. In 1993 the Hellenic Air Force received an additional sixty-two A-7Es and nineteen TA-7C surplus USN airplanes given to the 335 and 336 Squadrons. The last A-7Es were retired in October 2014 from the 336th Bomber Squadron.

General Dynamics F-16 Fighting Falcons began replacing the Air National Guard Corsairs beginning in the late 1980s and the last were retired in 1993 by the units at Rickenbacker Air National Guard Base, Ohio; Des Moines Air National Guard Base, Iowa; Tulsa Air National Guard Base, Oklahoma; and Springfield Air National Guard Base, Ohio.

US Navy A-7 Corsairs began being phased out of the fleet during the mid-1980s with the arrival of the McDonnell Douglas F/A-18 Hornet. A-7 squadrons of the United States Navy Reserve transitioned concurrent with (but prior to the completion of) all Regular Navy squadrons. The last Navy A-7s were retired by the last fleet operational squadrons (VA-46 and VA-72) in May 1991 shortly after their return from Operation Desert Storm. By the end of 1998, with the exception of some airframes used as static displays, all US A-7s were disposed of by the AMARC.

Some of these surplus aircraft were passed to Greece, Thailand and Portugal. Portuguese Air Force A-7Ps entered service in 1981 and started being phased-out in 1994 with the arrival of the first batch of F-16A Block 15. The last unit was retired in 1999 after 18 years of service. The Corsair II served for 49 years.

==== Failed Bids ====
In 1976, Pakistan started talks for 110 A-7Es to strengthen its border with India, which the Nixon administration initially offered but the Carter administration later rejected the deal fearing it would intensify an arms race in South Asia with India having recently concluded a $1.6 billion arms deal with the Soviet Union. In 1978, the US instead offered Pakistan 40 F-5E Tiger II with equipment for US$400 million, but Pakistan did not find the deal acceptable and bought the Chinese F-7MP/PG and A-5C instead.

== Variants ==
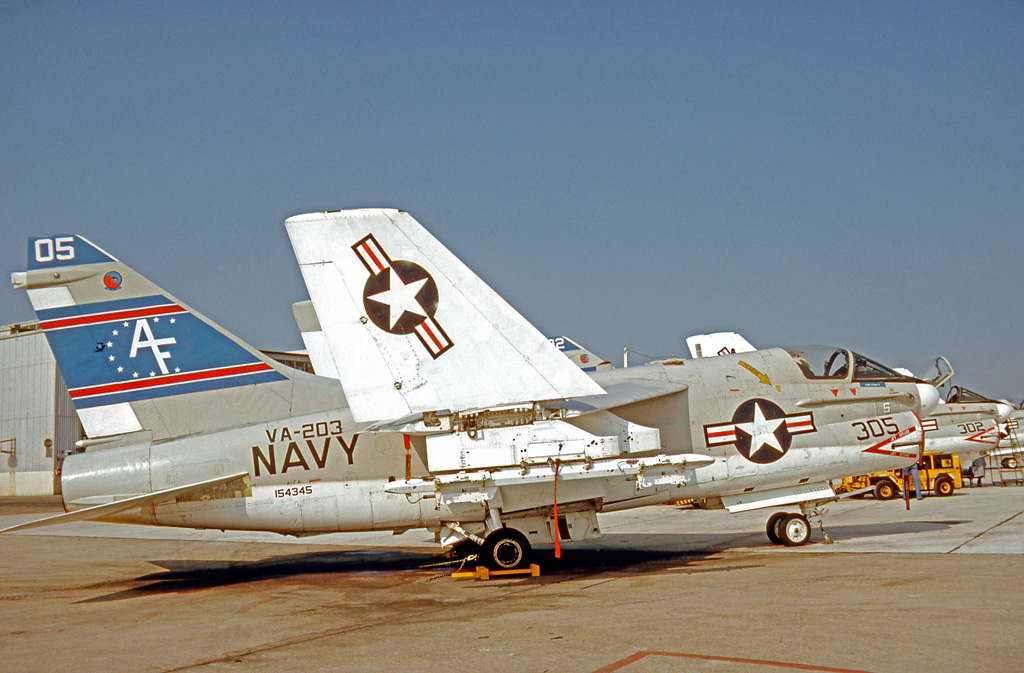
A-7A of VA-203, the "Blue Dolphins", at NAS Jacksonville Florida in 1976

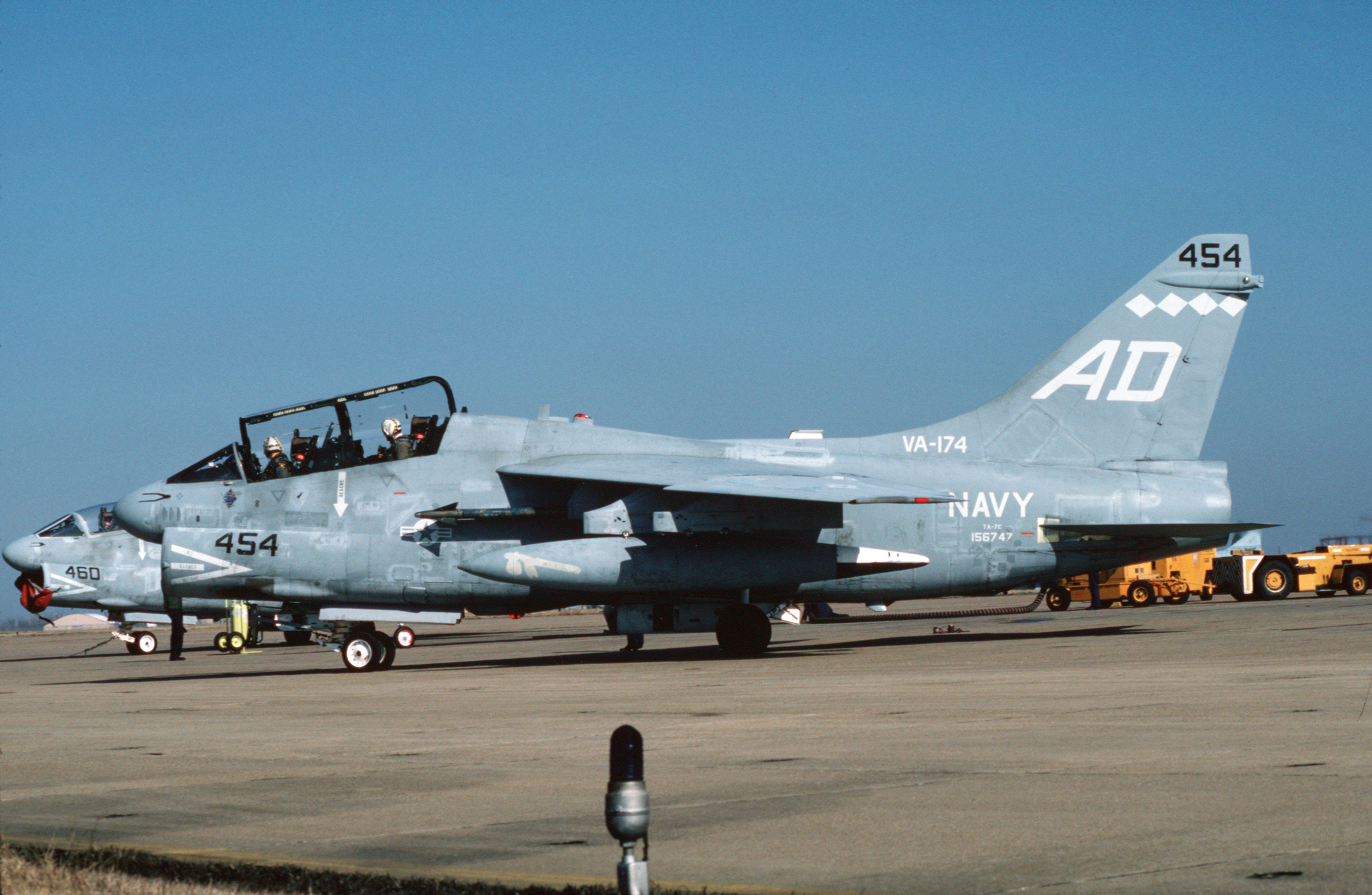
TA-7C of VA-174 in 1988

A-7A
First production version. Early US Navy Corsair IIs had two 20 mm Colt Mk 12 cannons with 250 rounds per gun. Maximum ordnance, carried primarily on the wing pylons, was theoretically 15,000 lb (6,800 kg), but was limited by maximum takeoff weight, so the full weapon load could only be carried with greatly reduced internal fuel. This model was equipped with the AN/APN-153 navigational radar, an AN/APQ-115 terrain following radar, and a separate AN/APQ-99 attack radar. 199 built.
A-7B
Uprated TF30-P-8 engine with 12,190 lbf (54.2 kN) of thrust. In 1971, all surviving A-7Bs were further upgraded with the TF30-P-408 engine with 13,390 lbf (59.6 kN) of thrust. The AN/APQ-115 terrain following radar was replaced with an AN/APQ-116 terrain following radar. 196 built.
A-7C
First 67 production A-7Es with TF30-P-8 engines.
TA-7C
Two-seat trainer version for US Navy. 24 were converted from A-7Bs, 36 from A-7Cs. In 1984, 49 airframes, including the 8 EA-7Ls, were re-engined with the TF41-A-402 and upgraded to A-7E standard.
A-7D
Version built for the US Air Force with a more powerful Allison TF41-A-1 turbofan engine producing 14,250 lb (63.4 kN) of thrust, and a single M61 Vulcan 20 mm rotary cannon. An improved AN/APN-185 navigational radar and an upgraded AN/APQ-126 terrain following radar were fitted. 459 built.
A-7E
Effectively an A-7D modified for naval operations, with the same Allison TF41-A-1 and M61 Vulcan 20 mm rotary cannon. Further improvements were an AN/APN-190 navigational radar and AN/APQ-128 terrain following radar in addition to arrestor gear and folding wings to allow for carrier operations. 529 built.
YA-7F Strikefighter (A-7D Plus)
Stretched supersonic version of A-7 powered by an F100. It was optimized for the interdiction role, but cancelled after two prototypes were built.
A-7G
Proposed version for Switzerland, none built.

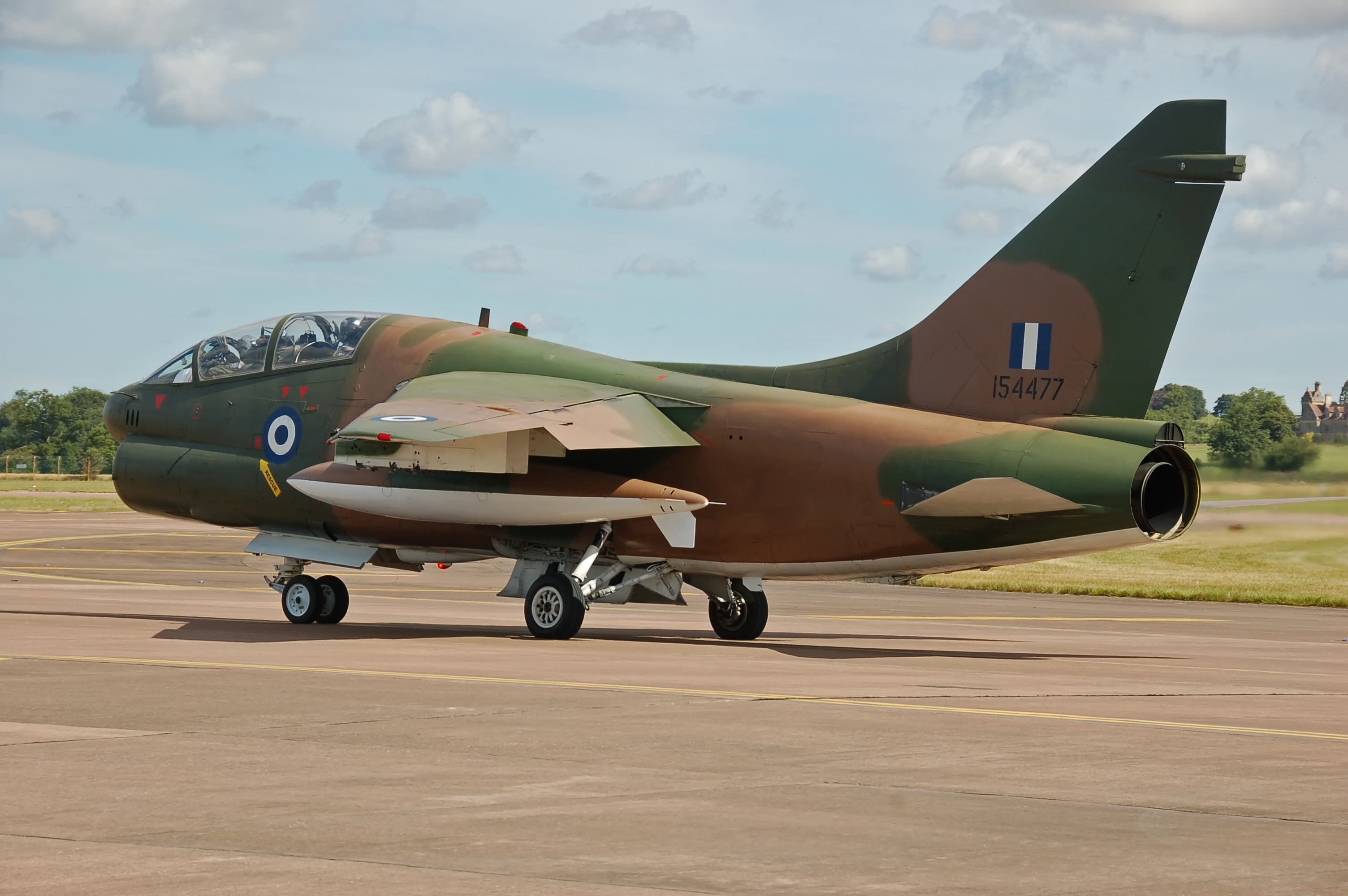
Greek Air Force LTV TA-7C Corsair II departs the Royal International Air Tattoo, UK, 2014

YA-7E/YA-7H
Two-seat prototypes built by Ling-Temco-Vought as a private venture.
A-7H
Modified A-7E for Greece without air-refueling capability. 60 built.
TA-7H
Two-seat trainer version for Greece.
A-7K
Two-seat trainer version for Air National Guard. 30 built.

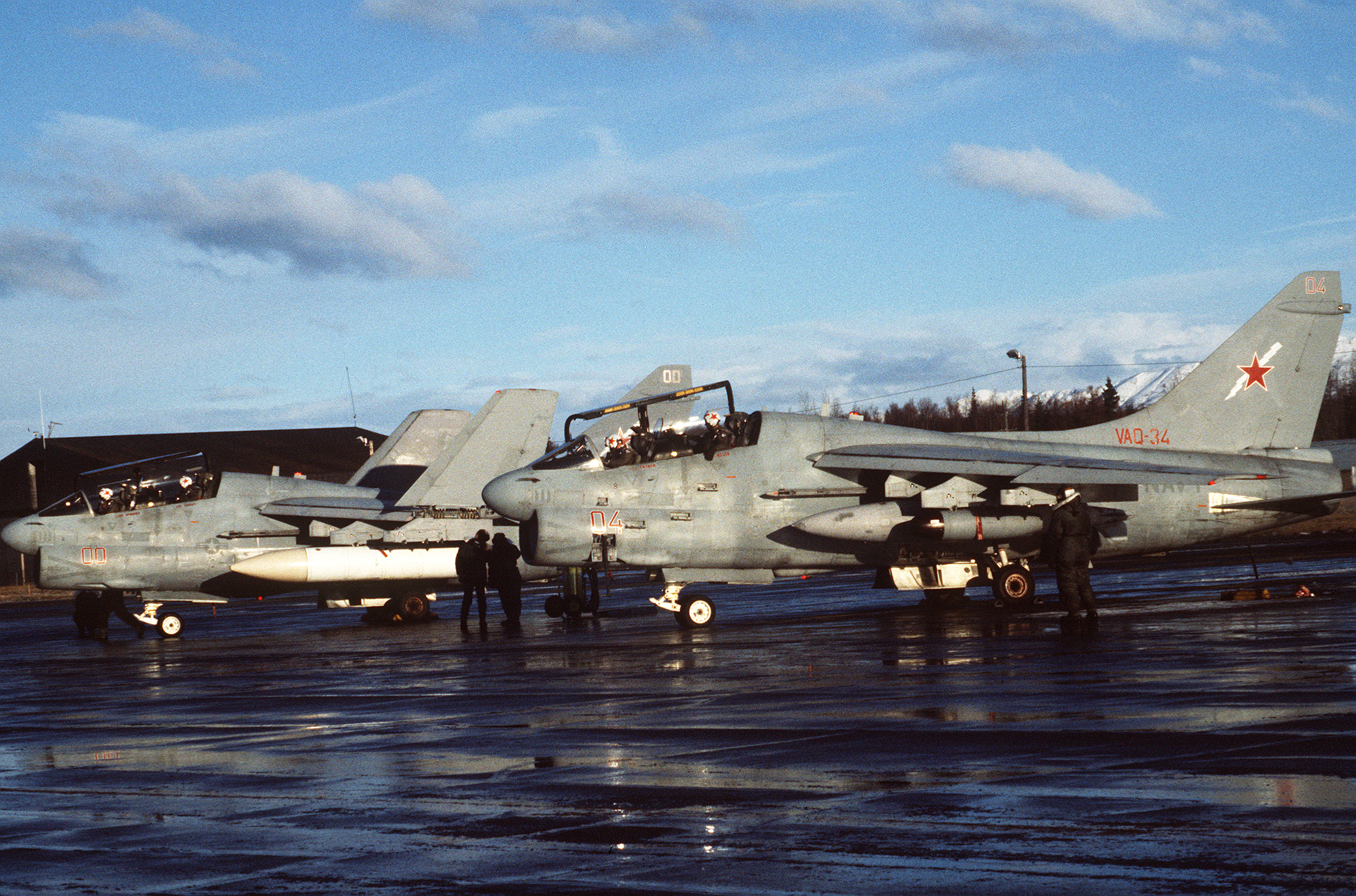
EA-7L of VAQ-34 in 1987

EA-7L
8 TA-7Cs modified into electronic aggressor aircraft and used by VAQ-34. These were upgraded to A-7E mechanical standards in 1984.
A-7P
US Navy A-7As rebuilt for the Portuguese Air Force. 44 refurbished with TF30-P-408 engines and an avionics fit similar to the A-7E.
TA-7P
Two-seat trainer version for the Portuguese Air Force. 6 were converted from secondhand US Navy A-7As.
B.HT.1
(Thai: บ.จต.๑) Royal Thai Armed Forces designation for the A-7E.

== Operators ==
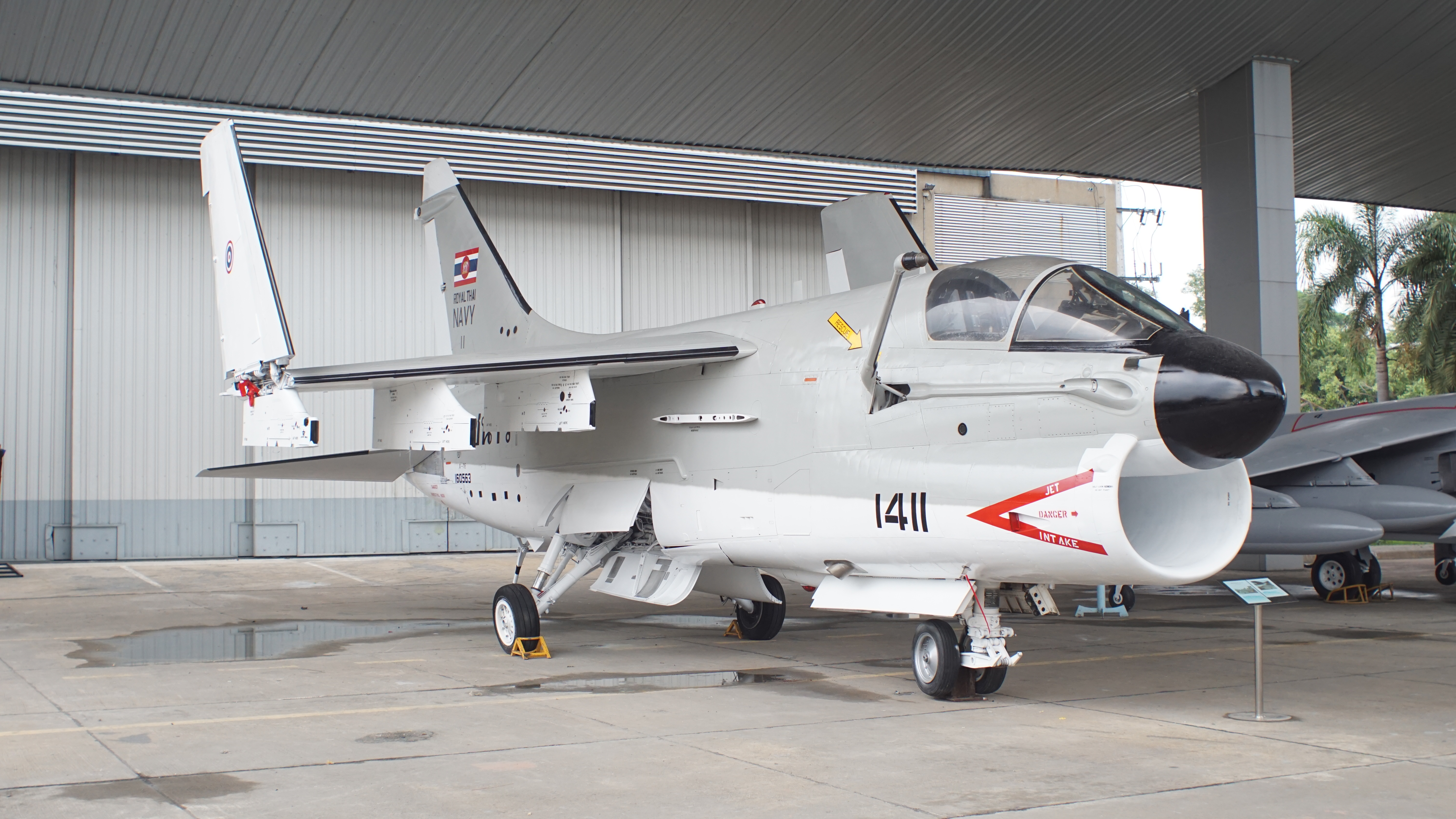
A Retired A-7E of the Royal Thai Navy in the Royal Thai Air Force Museum

- Greece – Retired in 2014
- Portugal – Retired in 1999
- Thailand – Non-operational status since 2007
- United States – Retired in 1991

== Aircraft on display ==
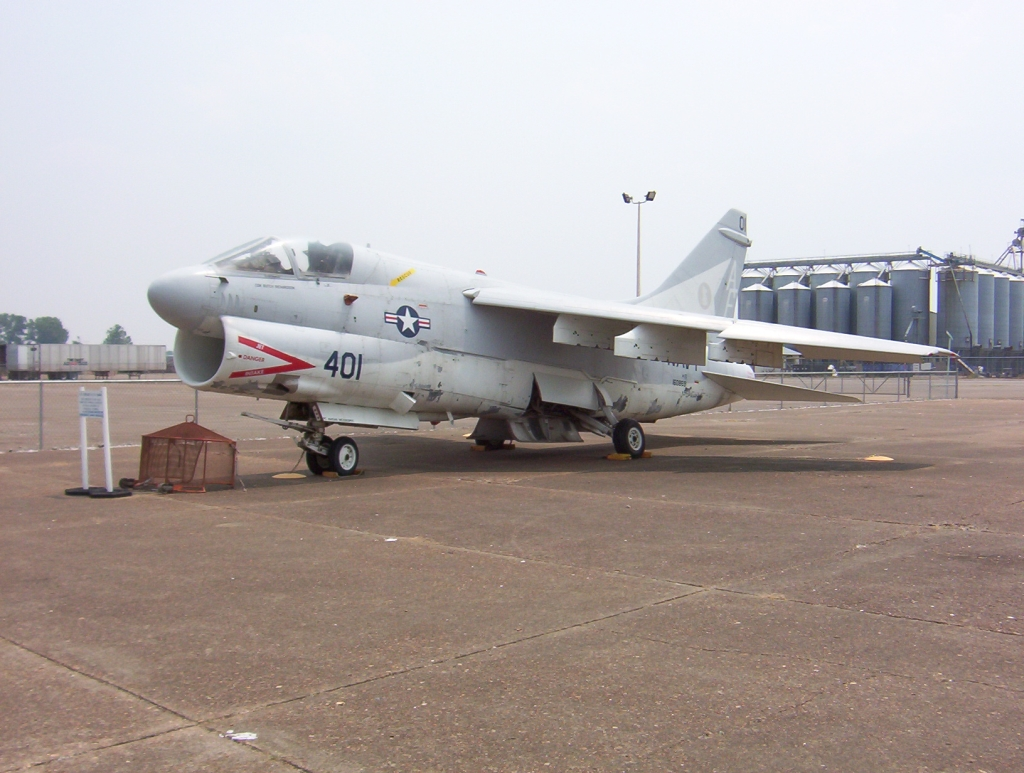
Retired A-7 Corsair II in front of the Veterans' Museum in Halls, Tennessee

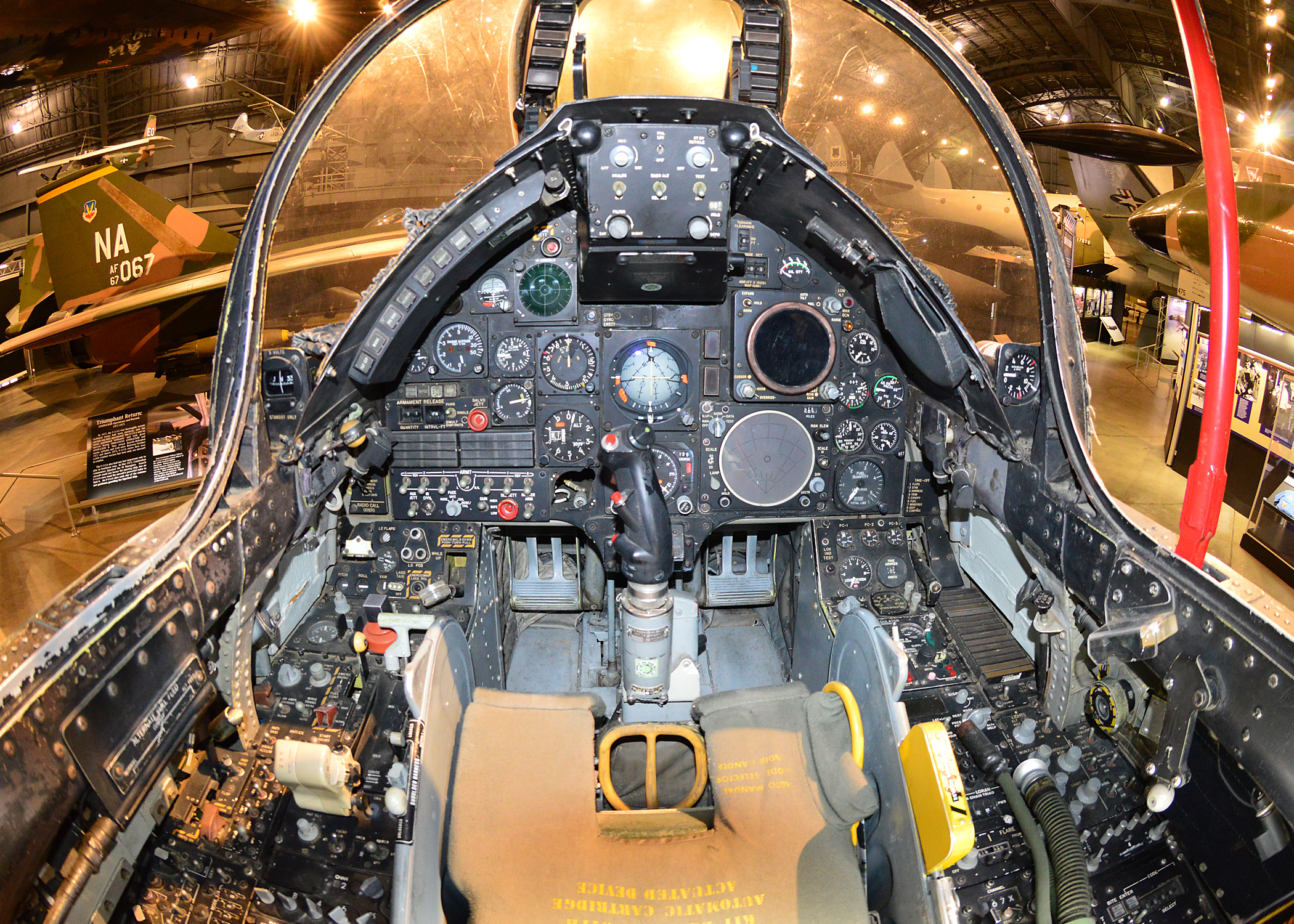
LTV A-7D Corsair II, cockpit

== Specifications (A-7E) ==
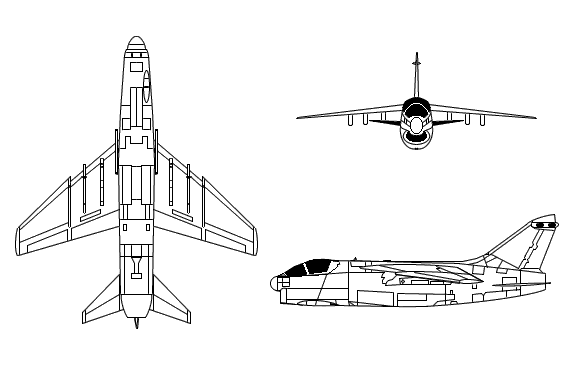
3-view line drawing of the LTV A-7 Corsair II

Data from Jane's All the World's Aircraft 1982–83, Complete Encyclopedia of World Aircraft, International Directory of Military Aircraft, Combat Aircraft since 1945, A-7E Standard Aircraft Characteristics (SAC)

General characteristics

- Crew: 1
- Length: 46 ft 2 in (14.06 m)
- Wingspan: 38 ft 9 in (11.8 m)
- Width: 23 ft 9 in (7.24 m) wings folded
- Height: 16 ft 1 in (4.9 m)
- Wing area: 374.9 sq ft (34.83 m^{2})
- Airfoil: NACA 65A007 root and tip
- Empty weight: 19,127 lb (8,676 kg)
- Max takeoff weight: 41,998 lb (19,050 kg) overload condition.
- Fuel capacity: 1,338 US gal (5,060 L; 1,114 imp gal) or 8,697 lb (3,945 kg) internal
- Powerplant: 1 × Allison TF41-A-2 non-afterburning turbofan engine, 15,000 lbf (66.7 kN) thrust

Performance

- Maximum speed: 600 kn (690 mph, 1,100 km/h) at sea level

562 kn (1,041 km/h; 647 mph) at 5,000 ft (1,500 m) with 12x Mk82 bombs
595 kn (1,102 km/h; 685 mph) at 5,000 ft (1,500 m) after dropping bombs

- Range: 1,070 nmi (1,231 mi, 1,981 km) maximum internal fuel
- Combat range: 772 nmi (888 mi, 1,430 km) hi-lo-lo-hi mission (100 nmi ingress and egress cruise at sea level) with 6× Mk 82 Snakeye, 3× 300 gal drop tanks
  - 432 nmi (497 mi; 800 km) primary attack mission (200 nmi ingress cruise at sea level; high altitude egress) with 12× Mk 81 Snakeye, internal fuel only
  - 916 nmi (1,054 mi; 1,696 km) nuclear strike mission (50 nmi maximum speed (~Mach 0.87) sea level ingress and egress) with 1× Mk 43 nuclear bomb and 3× 300 gal drop tanks (Note: All figures assume 500 rounds of 20 mm ammunition for M61 cannon, tanks jettisoned when empty, and include reserve fuel for 20 minute sea level loiter.)
- Ferry range: 1,342 nmi (1,544 mi, 2,485 km) with maximum internal and external fuel
- Service ceiling: 42,000 ft (13,000 m)
- Rate of climb: 15,000 ft/min (76.2 m/s)
- Wing loading: 77.4 lb/sq ft (378 kg/m^{2})
- Thrust/weight: 0.50 (full internal fuel, no stores)
- Sustained maneuvering performance: 5,300 ft (1,600 m) turning radius at 4.3g and 500 kn (930 km/h; 580 mph) at an All Up Weight (AUW) of 28,765 lb (13,048 kg)
- Take-off run: 1,705 m (5,594 ft) at 42,000 lb (19,000 kg)

Armament

- Guns: 1× M61A1 Vulcan 20 mm (0.79 in) rotary cannon with 1,030 rounds
- Hardpoints: 6× under-wing and 2× fuselage pylon stations (for mounting AIM-9 Sidewinder AAMs only) with a capacity of 15,000 lb (6,800 kg) total capacity, with provisions to carry combinations of:
  - Rockets: 4× LAU-10 rocket pods (each with 4× 127 mm (5.00 in) Zuni rockets)
  - Missiles:
    - 2× AIM-9 Sidewinder air-to-air missile
    - 2× AGM-45 Shrike anti-radiation missile
    - 2× AGM-62 Walleye TV-guided glide bomb
    - 2× AGM-65 Maverick air-to-ground missile
    - 2× AGM-88 HARM anti-radiation missile
    - 2× GBU-8 HOBOS electro-optically guided glide bomb
  - Bombs:
    - Up to 30× 500 lb (230 kg) Mark 82 bombs or Mark 80 series of unguided bombs (including 6.6 lb (3 kg) and 31 lb (14 kg) practice bombs)
    - Paveway series of laser-guided bombs
    - Up to 4× B28, B43, B57, B61 or B83 nuclear bombs
  - Other: up to 4 × 300 US gal (1,100 L; 250 imp gal), 330 US gal (1,200 L; 270 imp gal), or 370 US gal (1,400 L; 310 imp gal) drop tanks (Note: on pylon stations 1,3,6 & 8 which are wet plumbed. Used for ferry flight/extended range/increased loitering time. Often carried a hose and drogue type Buddy Store in addition to drop tanks for use as a tanker aircraft.)

Avionics

- AN/ASN-90(V) Inertial reference system
- AN/ASN-91(V) navigation/weapon delivery computer
- AN/APN-190(V) Doppler groundspeed and drift detector
- Texas Instruments AN/APQ-126(V) Terrain-following radar (TFR)
- AN/AVQ-7(V) Head-Up Display (HUD)
- CP-953A/AJQ solid state Air Data computer (ADC)
- AN/ASN-99 Projected Map Display (PMD)

== See also ==
- 1981 Muñiz Air National Guard Base attack

Related development

- LTV A-7P Corsair II
- Vought F-8 Crusader
- Vought YA-7F

Aircraft of comparable role, configuration, and era

- Blackburn Buccaneer
- Grumman A-6 Intruder
- Mikoyan MiG-27
- Sukhoi Su-17

Related lists

- List of attack aircraft
- Lists of military aircraft of the United States
- List of military electronics of the United States
