= Vought YA-7F =

Prototype transonic attack aircraft

YA-7F "Strikefighter"
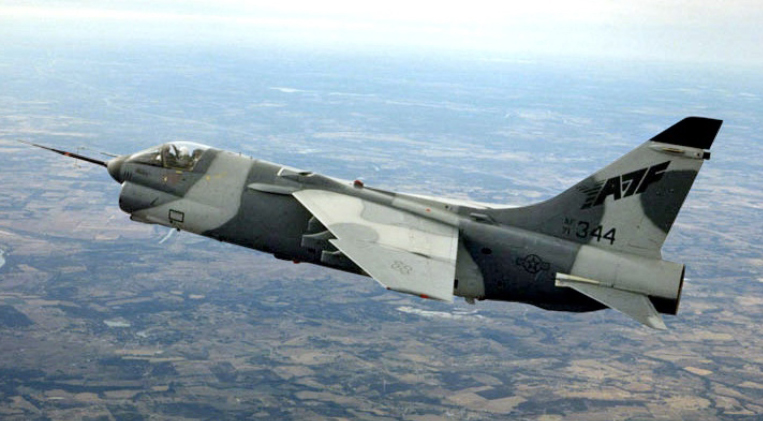
- YA-7F prototype in 1989

General information
- Type: Attack aircraft
- National origin: United States
- Manufacturer: Ling-Temco-Vought/Vought
- Status: Canceled
- Primary user: United States Air Force
- Number built: 2

History
- First flight: November 1989
- Developed from: LTV A-7 Corsair II

The Vought YA-7F "Strikefighter" is a prototype transonic attack aircraft based on the subsonic A-7 Corsair II. Two prototypes were converted from A-7Ds. The YA-7F was not ordered into production, its intended role being filled by the F-16 Fighting Falcon.

== Design and development ==
In 1985, the US Air Force requested proposals for a fast strike aircraft because of concerns that A-10 Thunderbolt II was too slow for interdiction. The design called for a new engine, either the Pratt & Whitney F100-PW-220 or General Electric F110-GE-100. LTV responded with the YA-7F, a supersonic version of the A-7 powered by an F100-PW-220 with 23,770 lbf (105.7 kN) thrust. During the development process, Aviation Week & Space Technology magazine reported that, early on, LTV also experimented with adapting the afterburner from an F100-PW-220 to the existing Allison TF41 engine. Because the TF41 had a higher bypass ratio, the addition of the afterburner produced a much higher thrust (26,000lbf) than the F100 could produce (which was 23,770lbf), while retaining the greater fuel economy of the TF41. To accommodate the longer engine, the fuselage was lengthened about 4 ft (1.22 m). New fuselage sections were inserted in both the forward and aft fuselage – a 30 in (76 cm) section in front of the wing and an 18 in (46 cm) section behind the wing. The reasons were three-fold: (1) to accommodate engine length issues, (2) to accommodate aerodynamic issues with shape, and (3) to accommodate weight distribution issues. The increase in internal volume allowed for more fuel and other stores improvements. The wing was strengthened and fitted with new augmented flaps, leading edge extensions and automatic maneuvering flaps.

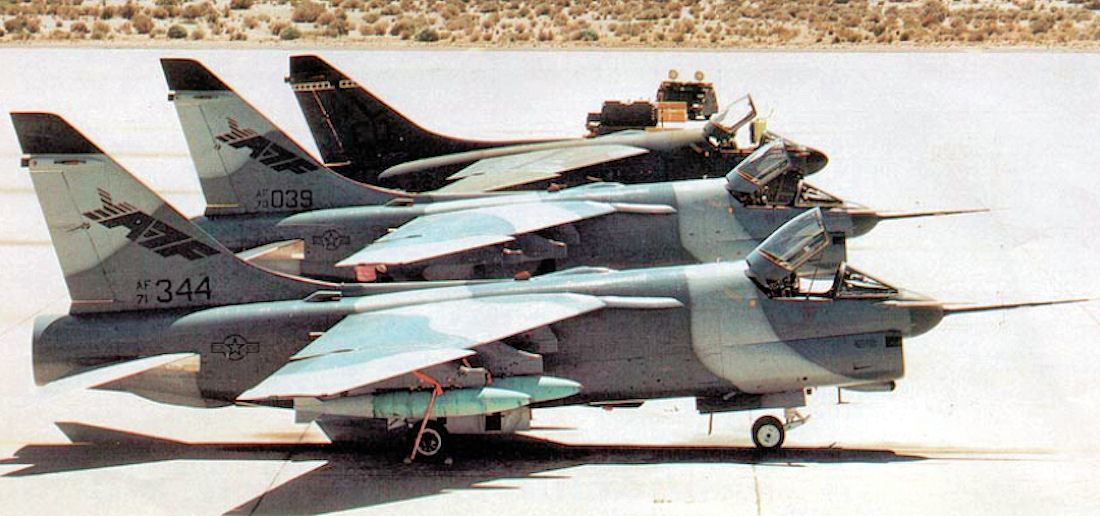
Both 445th Flight Test Squadron YA-7F Corsair IIs prototypes with an Edwards-based A-7D

The vertical stabilizer height was increased about 10 in (25 cm), the unit horizontal tail was flipped from dihedral to anhedral, and control surfaces were flattened. The end result resembled the supersonic F-8 Crusader from which the original subsonic A-7 was derived. Many of the vehicle systems and mission systems were heavily modified and upgraded with leading edge technology, including a Molecular Sieve Oxygen Generating System and better cockpit displays. Low Altitude Night Attack Systems, an improved HUD and many software enhancements for navigation and weapons delivery were planned and being designed concurrently by Vought Dallas.

The new supersonic A-7 could accelerate with a 17,380 lb (7,880 kg) bomb load from 400 to 550 knots (1,020 km/h) in under 15 seconds and could sustain Mach 1.2 for longer times with the extra fuel. The YA-7F modifications allowed 7-g turn and burn capability that permitted high-speed sustained evasive maneuvers plus great improvements in high angle of attack performance. As a CAS/BAI platform to penetrate into enemy territory and return safely, the "Strikefighter" moniker was most fitting. Two A-7Ds were extensively modified, the first one flying on 29 November 1989, and breaking the sound barrier on its second flight. The second prototype flew on 3 April 1990.

The project was canceled due to improved relations with former adversaries, lower defense budgets, and the Air National Guard, by then the principal US operator of the A-7, generally favoring the in-production F-16 Fighting Falcon.

== Variants ==
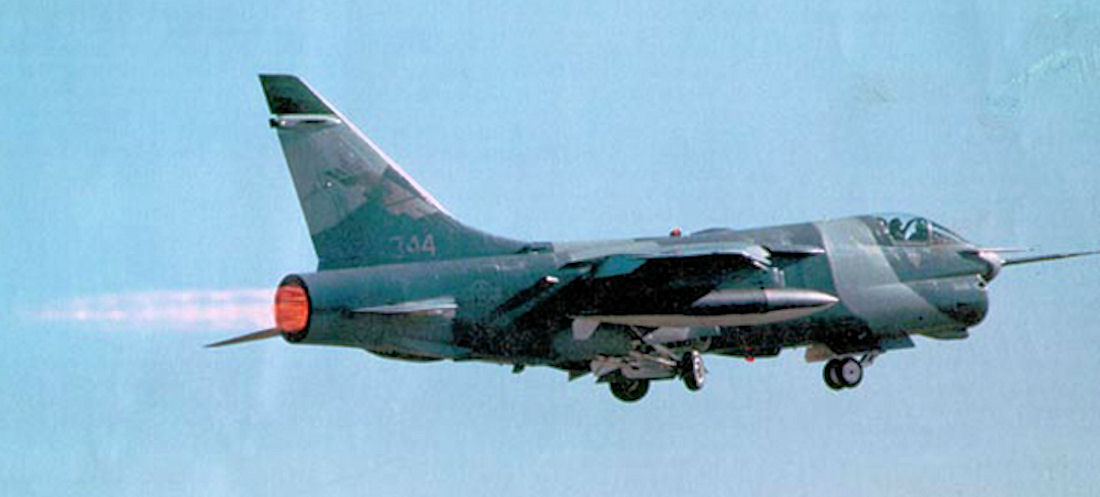
YA-7F prototype 71-0344 in 1989 with afterburner in flight

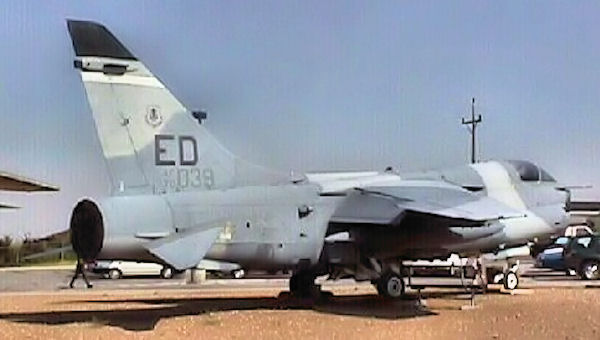
YA-7F, S/N 70-1039, at the Hill Aerospace Museum

YA-7F (A-7D Plus / A-7 Strikefighter)
Stretched, supersonic version of A-7 powered by a Pratt & Whitney F100-220 turbofan, optimized for interdiction role, but cancelled after only two were built.

== Operators ==
United States

- United States Air Force

== Aircraft on display ==
- 70-1039 – Hill Aerospace Museum, Hill AFB, Utah.
- 71-0344 – Air Force Flight Test Center Museum, Edwards AFB, California.

== Specifications (YA-7F) ==
Data from Hill Aerospace Museum fact sheet

General characteristics

- Crew: One pilot
- Length: 50 ft 1/2 in (15.253 m)
- Wingspan: 38 ft 9 in (11.81 m)
- Height: 16 ft 11 in (5.16 m)
- Empty weight: 23,068 lb (10,463 kg)
- Max takeoff weight: 46,000 lb (20,865 kg)
- Powerplant: 1 × Pratt & Whitney F100-PW-220 turbofan, 23,770 lbf (105.7 kN) with afterburner

Performance

- Maximum speed: Mach 1.2
- Range: 2,302 mi (3,705 km, 2,000 nmi) maximum with four 300-US-gallon (1,100 L) external tanks
- Service ceiling: 55,000 ft (17,000 m)

Armament

- Guns: 1× 20 mm (0.787 in) M61 Vulcan rotary cannon
- Hardpoints: external with a capacity of over 17,000 lb (7,700 kg) of ordnance

== See also ==
Related development

- LTV A-7 Corsair II
- Vought F-8 Crusader

Related lists

- List of attack aircraft
- List of military aircraft of the United States
