= 347th Squadron (HAF) =

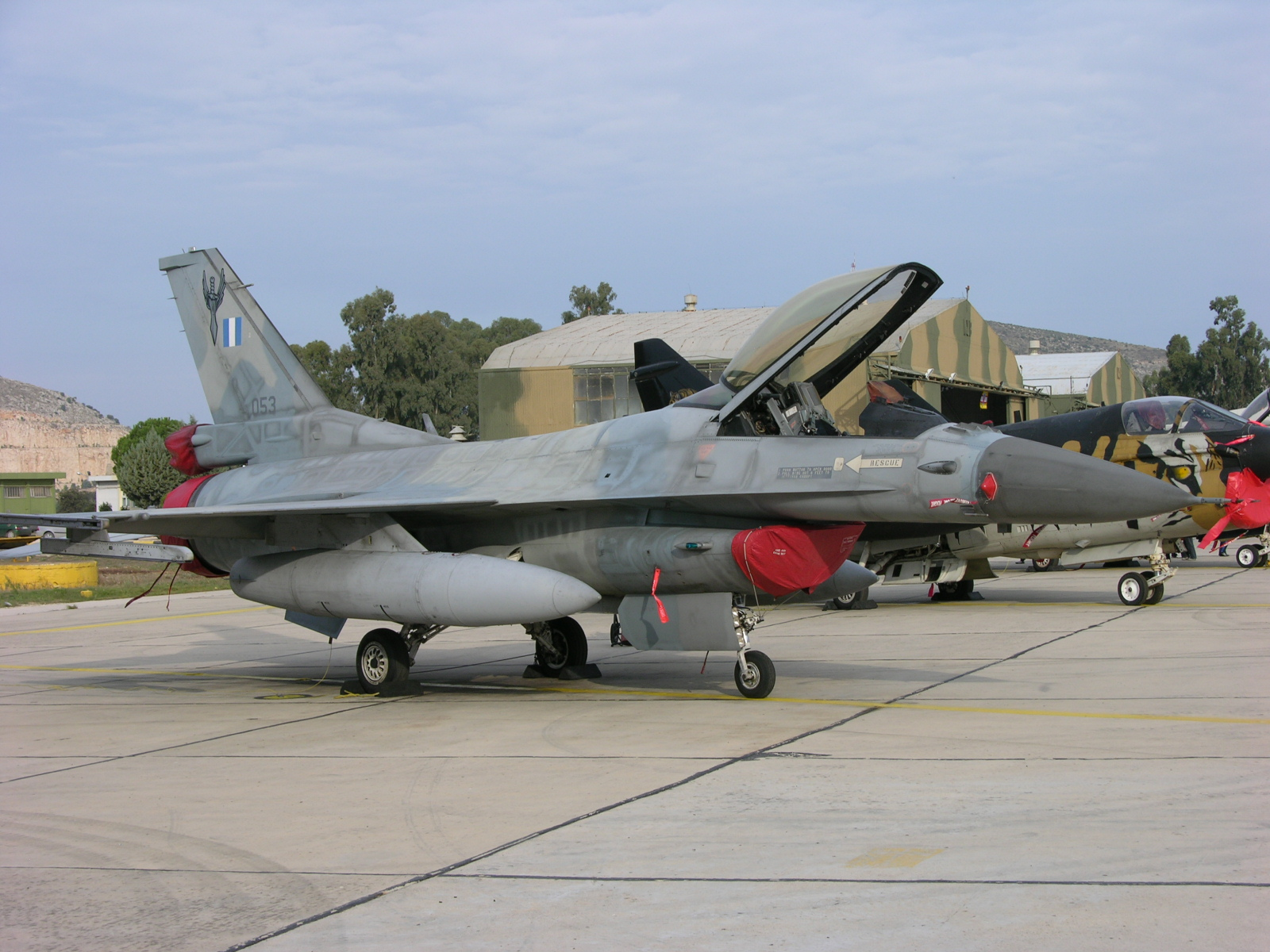
- F-16C of 347th Squadron at Araxos Air Base, 2008
- Active: 1977–1992, 1997–today
- Branch: Hellenic Air Force
- Part of: 111th Combat Wing
- Garrison/HQ: Nea Anchialos Air Base

Aircraft flown
- Fighter: A-7H Corsair (1977–1992); F-16 Block 50 (1997–)

The 347th Squadron (Greek: 347 Μοίρα, 347 M), callsign "Perseus" (ΠΕΡΣΕΑΣ), is a squadron in service with the Hellenic Air Force, forming part of the 111th Combat Wing. It is based at Nea Anchialos Air Base, and operates the F-16 Block 50 aircraft.

== History ==
The squadron was established in early 1977 as the 347th Bomber Squadron (347 Μοίρα Βομβαρδισμού), at the Souda Air Base (115th Combat Wing). Once its strength was complete, it moved to 110th Combat Wing at Larissa Air Base on 10 June 1977, with 19 A-7H Corsair aircraft.

The squadron was disbanded on 21 July 1992, and its aircraft handed over to 115 Combat Wing. Preparations for the squadron's reactivation, this time with F-16 Block 50 aircraft, began in 1995, with personnel from the existing F-16 squadrons, 330th and 346th. The squadron's new base was 111th Combat Wing at Nea Anchialos Air Base. The squadron was officially re-established on 7 July 1997 under its current designation, with dual fighter-bomber and interceptor roles.
