= List of Danish Military Installations =

== Naval Bases ==
- Naval Base Korsør, Korsør
- Naval Base Frederikshavn, Frederikshavn

== Naval Stations ==
- Naval Station Esbjerg, Esbjerg
- Naval Station Holmen, Copenhagen
- Naval Station Kongsøre, Kongsøre
- Naval Station Lyngsbæk, Lyngsbæk
- Naval Station Møn, Møn
- Naval Station Århus, Århus

== Air Force Bases ==
- Aalborg Air Base, Aalborg
- Karup Air Base, Karup
- Skrydstrup Air Base, Skrydstrup
- Værløse Air Base, Værløse - Closed
- Vandel Air Base - Closed

== Army Bases ==
- Aalborg Kaserne, Aalborg
- Antvorskov Kaserne, Slagelse
- Bornholm
- Fredericia Kaserne, Fredericia
- Haderslev Kaserne, Haderslev
- Holbæk Barracks, Holbæk - Closed
- Holstebro Kaserne, Holstebro
- Høvelte Kaserne, Høvelte
- Hyby Fælled Proving ground
- Langelandsgade Kaserne, Aarhus - Closed
- Nymindegab Barracks
- Oksbøl Kaserne
- Rosenborg Kaserne, Copenhagen
- Roskilde Kaserne, Roskilde - Closed
- Skive Kaserne, Skive
- Sølvgade Kaserne, Copenhagen - Closed
- Varde Kaserne, Varde
- Vordingborg Kaserne, Vordingborg
