= Eskadrille 724 =

Squadron 724
- Eskadrille 724 (Danish)
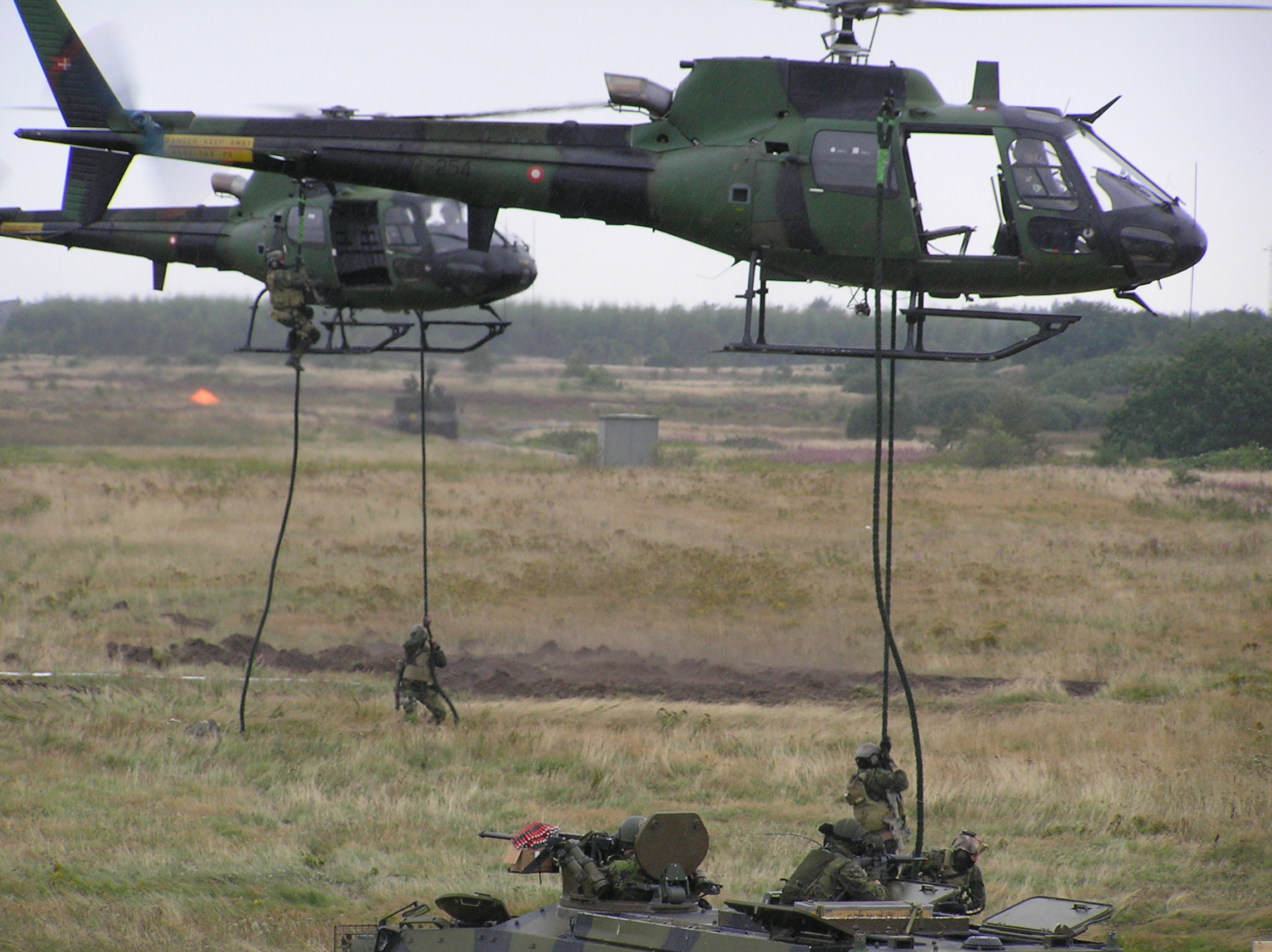
- Soldiers emerging from two AS 550 Fennec from Eskadrille 724
- Founded: 7 August 2003; 22 years ago
- Country: Denmark
- Branch: Royal Danish Air Force
- Role: Observation; Reconnaissance
- Part of: Helicopter Wing Karup
- Garrison/HQ: Air Base Karup
- Motto(s): Videmus et pugnamus (We see and fight)

Insignia
- Current insignia

- CoA of the Army Air Corps

Squadron 724 (Danish: Eskadrille 724) is a Royal Danish Air Force helicopter squadron, based at Karup Air Base in central Jutland.

The squadron was officially established on 7 August 2003, following the disbandment and reorganization of the Danish army's Royal Danish Army Air Corps (Hærens Flyvetjeneste, HFT). The name "Hærens Flyvetjeneste" continued to be used until August 2005.

The squadron consist of 12 AS 550 Fennec. Under the Danish Defence agreement 2005-09, Squadron 724 was slated for disbandment. The Fennec helicopters lost their anti-tank capabilities and were repurposed for light transport and scout roles.

Until 12 September 2005 the squadron also operated 10 H-500 Cayuse helicopters.

== Previous Squadron 724 ==
A previous Squadron 724 existed within the Danish Air Force prior to its reestablishment in 2003.

On 8 January 1951, Squadron 724 was formed at Karup Air Base and was soon equipped with 20 Gloster Meteor fighters. In June 1952, the squadron relocated to Aalborg Air Base, and in 1956 it transitioned to using Hawker Hunter fighters. In 1958, the squadron returned to Karup Air Base but was moved again in 1959 to Skrydstrup Air Base.

Under the Danish Defence Agreement of 26 April 1973, Squadron was slated for disbandment. The final flight of a Hawker Hunter from the squadron took place on 30 March 1974, when the aircraft was transferred to Aalborg Air Base for decommissioning and storage.

== Sources ==
- FOV Newsletter no.15, 2003 ISSN 1602-4982
- Karup Air Base tjenestestedsblad "Vindposen", December 2003
- FLV12-okt2005
