= Eskadrille 723 =

Squadron 723
- Eskadrille 723
- Founded: 8 January 1951; 74 years ago
- Country: Denmark
- Branch: Royal Danish Air Force
- Part of: Helicopter Wing Karup
- Garrison/HQ: Air Base Karup
- Motto(s): Valet Vigilat

The Danish Navy Air Squadron (Danish: Søværnets Helikoptertjeneste), was the aerial component of the Danish navy, from 1977 to December 31, 2010. Operationally it was directly under command of the Danish Naval Command, but maintenance of the eight Westland Lynx helicopters and training of personnel was in cooperation with the air force. The helicopters were used primarily for fishery patrol, shipboard support and coastal Search & Rescue (SAR) missions.

The tasks and hardware have now been transferred to the air force as Eskadrille 723 (Squadron 723).

== History ==
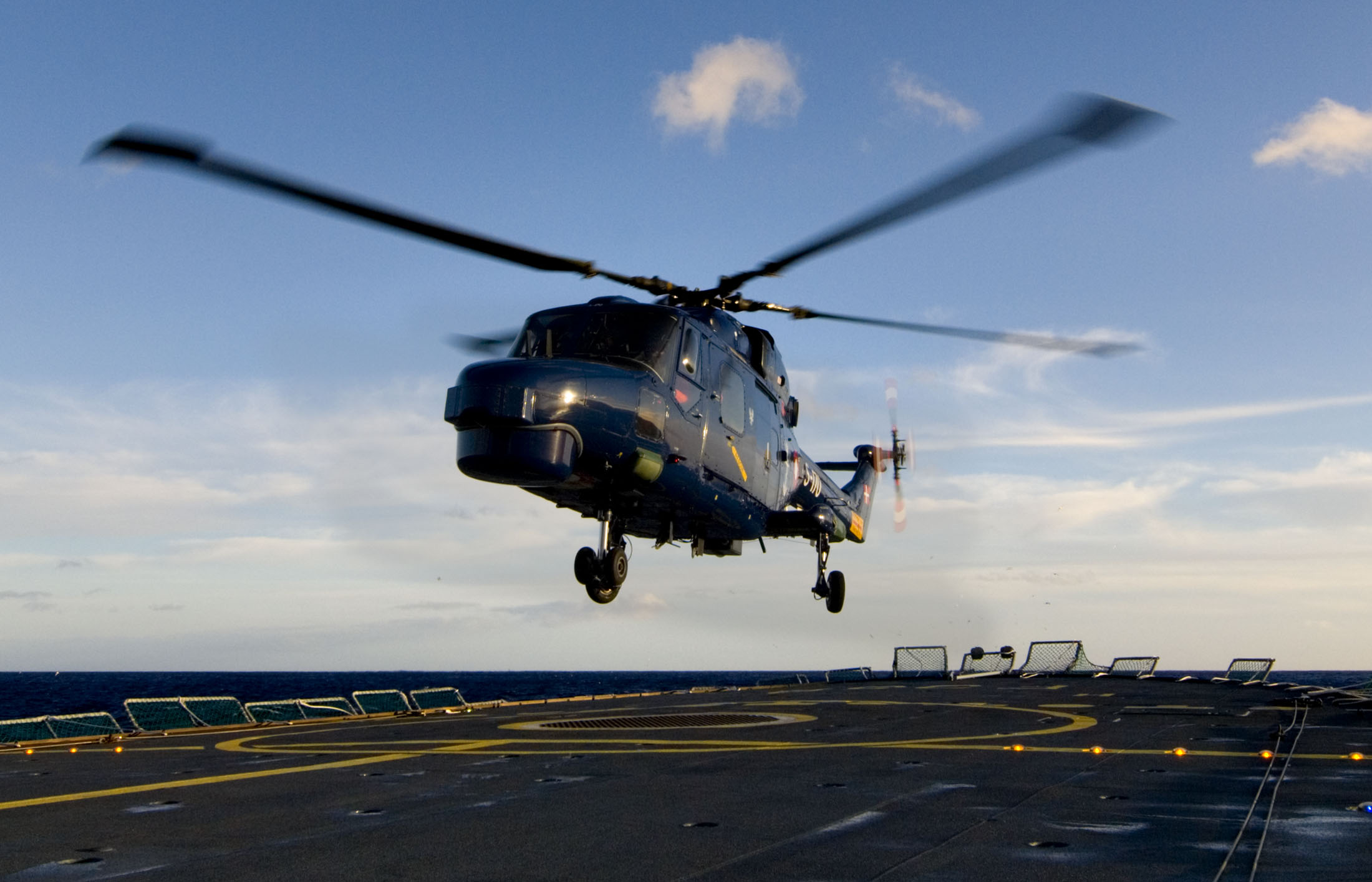
DNAS Super Lynx Mk.90B landing on a Thetis-class vessel

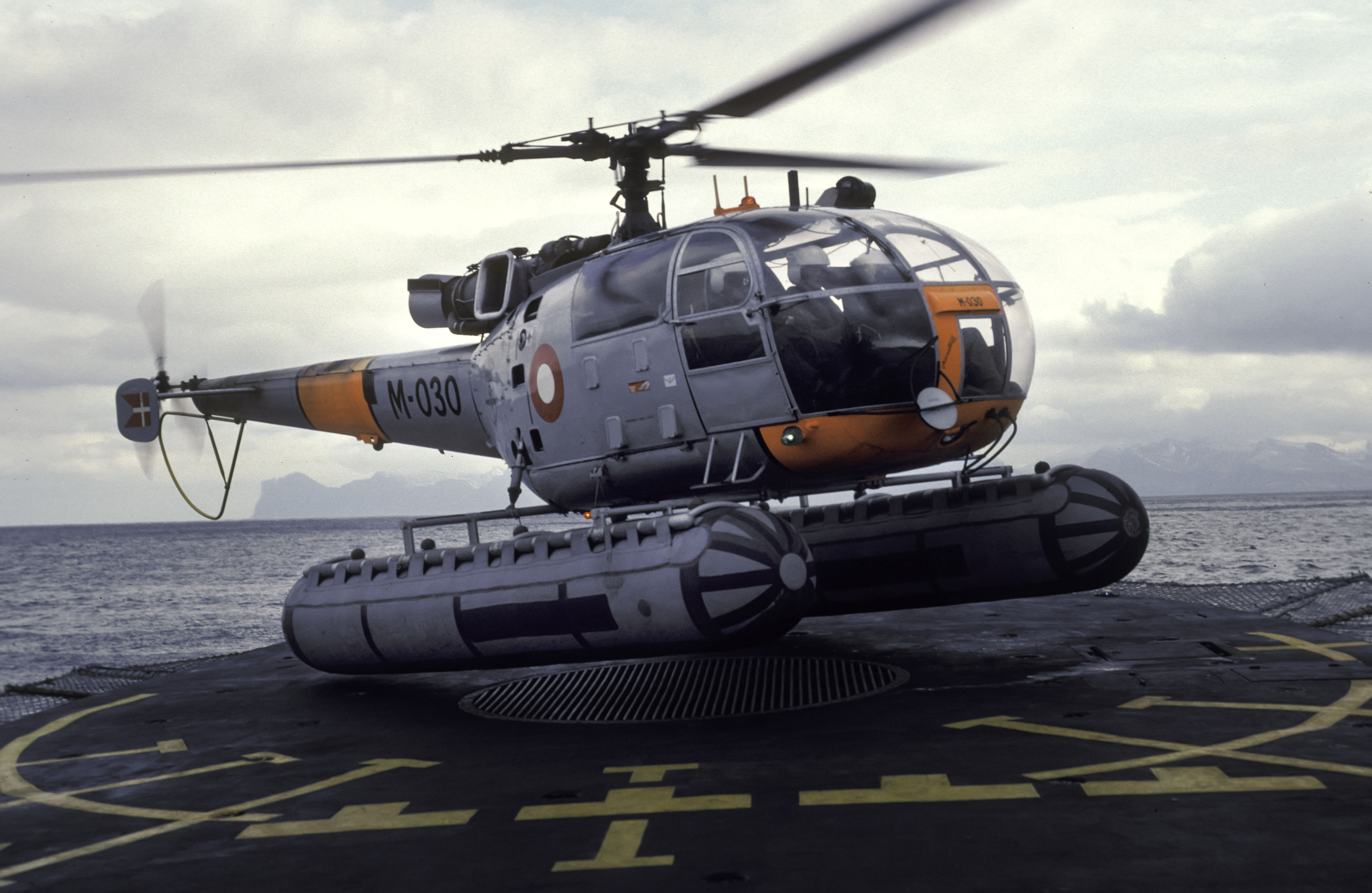
DNAS Alouette III helicopter landing an Arctic Patrol Vessel (1962-1982)

The squadron was originally a flight in the air force eskadrille 722 (722nd Squadron) when the first Alouette III helicopter was received in 1962. In 1977 the flight was made into a unit of its own and became a part of the navy, under the name Søværnets Flyvetjeneste (The Naval Air Service).

In 1980-1982 the eight Alouette helicopters were replaced with the new Westland Lynx helicopters.

In 2000 it was decided that Søværnets Flyvetjeneste should be transferred to the air force as a squadron (728th Squadron) and put under operational command of the air force command along with the Army Air Corps (Hærens Flyvetjeneste), but for a political reason only the army units were transferred to the air force (as 724th Squadron). At the same time, all the Danish helicopter units were also to move physically from Værløse Air Station and Vandel Air Station to Karup Air Station. The total number of helicopters in the air force would have been 8 Sikorsky S-61A, 13 Eurocopter AS550C2 Fennec, 16 Hughes H-500C Cayuse and 8 Westland Lynx Mk.90B as well as 14 AgustaWestland EH-101 Merlin under purchase - a grand total of 59 helicopters. International obligations didn't allow for the Danish air force to possess so many helicopters. Because of that the Naval Air Service was transformed into the Naval Air Squadron on 1 January 2004.

A Danish navy helicopter foiled a pirate attack off Somali coast, 28 August 2010.

=== Historical equipment ===
| Aircraft | In service | Versions | Number | Notes |
|---|---|---|---|---|
| Sud Aviation Alouette III | 1962–1982 | SE3160 | 8 | |
| Westland Lynx | 1987–2006 | Mk.23 | 1 | Only used for ground training. |
| Westland Lynx | 1980–2004 | Mk.80 | 8 | |
| Westland Lynx | 1987–2003 | Mk.90 | 2 | Replacement for two crashed Mk.80s |

== Organisation ==
Order of Battle on 31 December 2010, the day it was disbanded:

| Aircraft | Type | Versions | In service | Notes |
|---|---|---|---|---|
| Westland Super Lynx | transport/rescue helicopter | Mk.90B | 8 | |

== Bases ==
Vaerlose (ICAO code: EKVL) Vaerlose is located northwest of Copenhagen, only about 20 km from the city centre. It was originally constructed as an army camp in 1910 and rebuild as a military airfield in the 1930s. After WW2 RDAF operations were resumed, principally with transport aircraft. It became the main base of the Naval Air Service in 1962. On 1 April 2004 the airfield was closed as a military base, due to military budget cuts, and handed over to civilian use in October 2008. Runway data: Location: N55° 46' 3" E012° 20' 36", Elev: 58 ft (18 m), Rwy 28/10, Size: 8061 x 150 ft (2457 x 46 m).

Karup (ICAO: EKKA) Karup is located between Herning and Viborg in central Denmark. It is a dual civil-military airport. It was originally built by the Germans in WW2 as Fliegerhorst Grove, and taken over by the RDAF post war. Since 2004 it has been the main helicopter base for the Danish Defence. Runway data: Location: N56° 17' 50.85" E009° 07' 28.66", Elev: 170 ft (52 m), Rwy 04/22, Size: 2936 x 50 ft (895 x 15 m), Rwy 09/27, Size: 2789 x 197 ft (850 x 60 m), Rwy 09R/27L, Size: 9607 x 150 ft (2928 x 46 m), Rwy 09L/27R, Size: 9816 x 75 ft (2992 x 23 m), Rwy 14/32, Size: 2296 x 60 ft (700 x 18 m).

== Future plans ==
The Westland Super Lynx is in the process of being replaced with a new helicopter. Danish Defence Acquisition and Logistics Organization has placed an order for the Sikorsky Seahawk MH60-R

== References and external sources ==
- Artikel om Søværnets Flyvetjeneste (2000)
