= Værløse Air Base =

Former Air Base in Værløse, Denmark

Vaerloese Air Base
- Flyvestation Værløse
- South of Værløse in Furesø Municipality
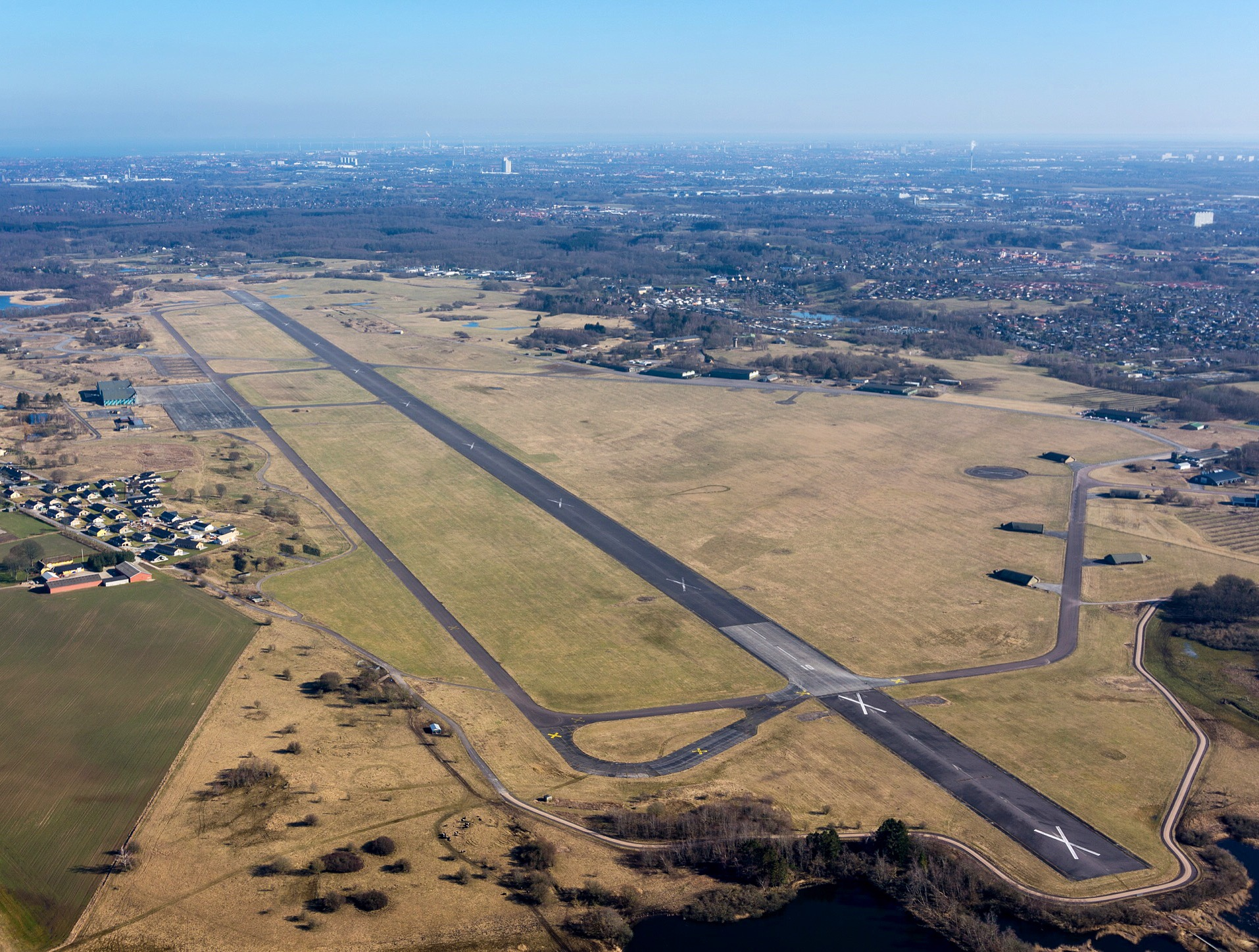
- Aerial view of the former Vaerloese Air Base looking east.

Site information
- Owner: Ministry of Defence
- Operator: Royal Danish Air Force

Location
- Location in Denmark
- Coordinates: 55°46′02″N 12°20′36″E

Site history
- Built: 1934; 92 years ago
- In use: April 1, 2004

Airfield information
- Identifiers: ICAO: EKVL
- Elevation: 18 metres (59 ft) AMSL
Runways
| Direction | Length and surface |
|---|---|
| 10/28 | 2,457 metres (8,061 ft) Asphalt/concrete |

Værløse Air Base (Danish: Flyvestation Værløse) (ICAO: EKVL) is a former Royal Danish Air Force air base located just south of Værløse, Furesø Municipality, 20 kilometres northwest of central Copenhagen, Denmark.

== History ==
=== Foundation ===
A camp for Royal Danish Army recruits was established at the site in 1910. The airfield was built in 1934. Over the next few years, hangars and facilities for five squadrons were built. The first of these was a command squadron for the air wing. It was followed by a fighter squadron and a reconnaissance squadron of each of two army divisions.

=== World War II ===
The Fokker C.V reconnaissance aircraft and Fokker D.XXI fighters stationed at the air base were tasked with the defense of Copenhagen but many of them were not combat ready at the start of World War II when Denmark was occupied by Nazi Germany since their locally produced machine guns had not yet been installed. At 05:25 am on 9 April 1940, the air base was attacked by Messerschmitt Bf 110 aircraft of the German Luftwaffe. During the attack, which came in five waves and only lasted about 45 minutes, almost all of the Danish aircraft were destroyed. A reconnaissance aircraft which had just taken off was shot down, killing its crew. The Germans were only aiming for aircraft, leaving the air base infrastructure intact for their own later use. The airfield was used by the Luftwaffe during the rest of the war, stationing several units there. One Focke-Wulf Fw 187 fighter was stationed there from 1942. It was also used for captured Allied aircraft, such as a Boeing B-17 Flying Fortress of the United States Army Air Forces in 1944.

Towards the end of the war, as the German Eastern Front began to collapse, flights with refugees from East Prussia and the Baltic states began coming to the airfield. At the time of the capitulation, 131 aircraft had accumulated at the base. Immediately after the war, the airfield served as a refugee camp.

=== Post-war history ===
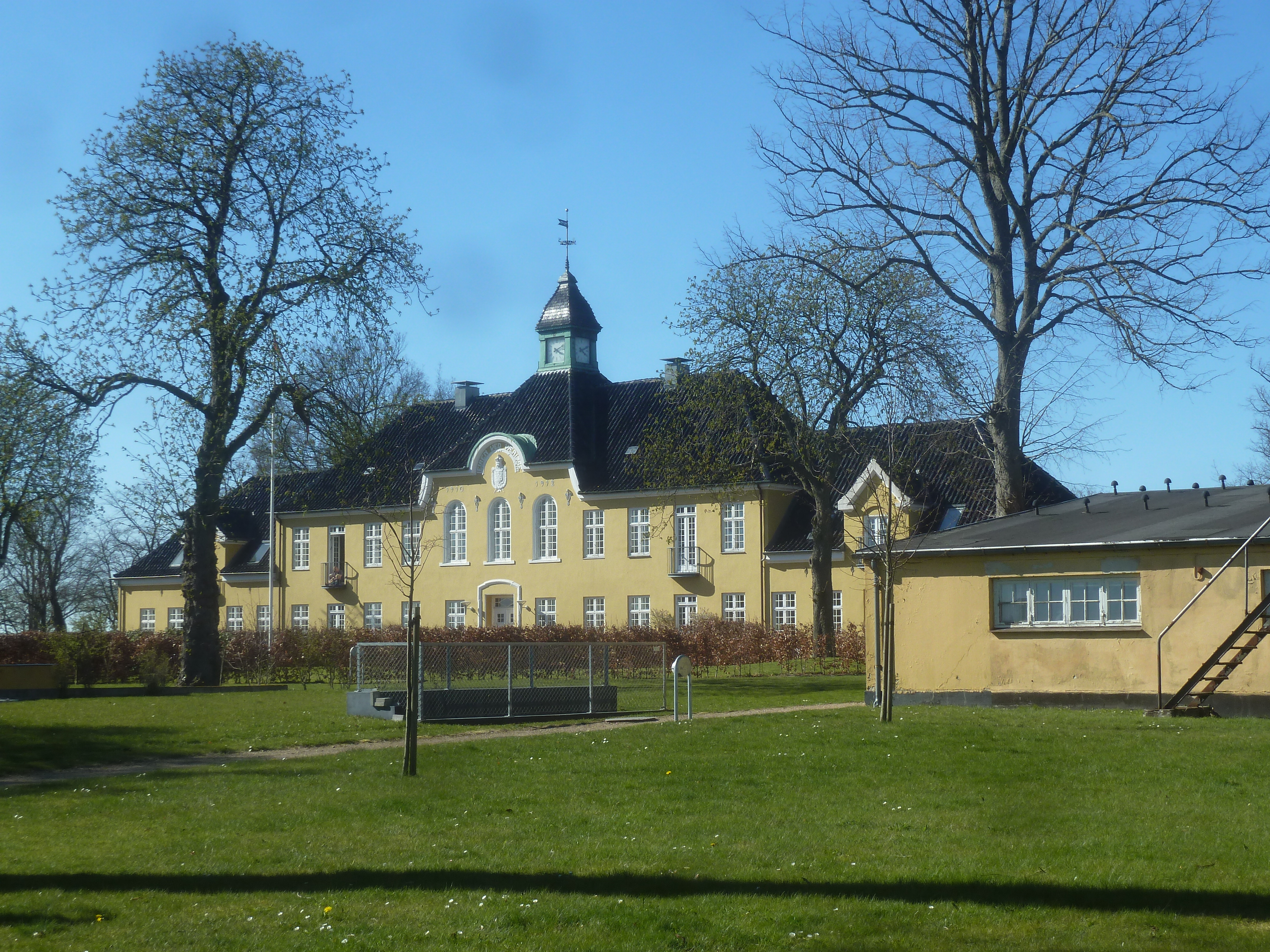
Nordlejren's old main building

The Danish army returned in early 1946. A Flight Mechanics School opened at the base in March 1947. The Royal Danish Air Force was founded in October 1950 through the merger of Royal Danish Army Air Corps and the Royal Danish Naval Air Services. In January 1951 Værløse became the home of the Danish Air Command (Flyvertaktisk Kommando) and Eastern Command. It also became home to the Royal Danish Air Force Officers School and the Air Force Sergeant and Reserve Officer School. Eskadrille 722, a light transport squadron, was also formed at the base. When it was transformed into a search and rescue unit, a station flight was established for minor transport duties.

In 1952, a planned upgrade of the runways to handle jet aircraft resulted in a lot of controversy in the Danish media. Copenhagen municipality supported the local parish council since area would stretch all the way to Søndersø Waterworks, which had just been refurbished for many millions. It was proposed to move the air base to the north of Sjælland, but the Ministry of Defence deemed it too expensive to move the air base. The new NATO standard runway was completed in late 1953. Eastern Command moved to Karup Air Base after being merged with Western Command in 1955. It was replaced by the Training Command at Værløse.

Eskadrille 721 arrived at the airfield in May 1956. In 1974 and 1975 the airfield received another update. A new hangar and 12 concrete shelters were also built in relation with NATO's rapid response plan. A new control tower and a passenger terminal and operations bunker completed the update.

Most of Værløse Air Base was closed down on 1 April 2004. The last flying units moved to Karup, Aalborg and Skalstrup.

== Residential Redevelopment ==
The North Camp (Nordlejren) at Værløse was built in 1912–13. 21 October 2004 Kuben Byg A/S won a tender to buy 94 hectares of land to develop. May 2005 an agreement was reached between the Danish interior minister Lars Løkke Rasmussen and the municipalities of Værløse and Farum to transfer for free the unsold land and buildings of the former airfield to the future Furesø Municipality. As of 2026 the redeveloped North Camp, called Laanshøj, situated 3 kilometers west of Værløse, is home to around 1000 residents.

In 2013, the Danish Culture Agency took over most of the North Camp, including two large hangars which will be used for exhibitions and other cultural activities. The Danish Nature Agency took over the central green spaces. The South Camp will be redeveloped into a mixed-use residential neighbourhood by Freja Ejendomme in collaboration with Furesø municipality.

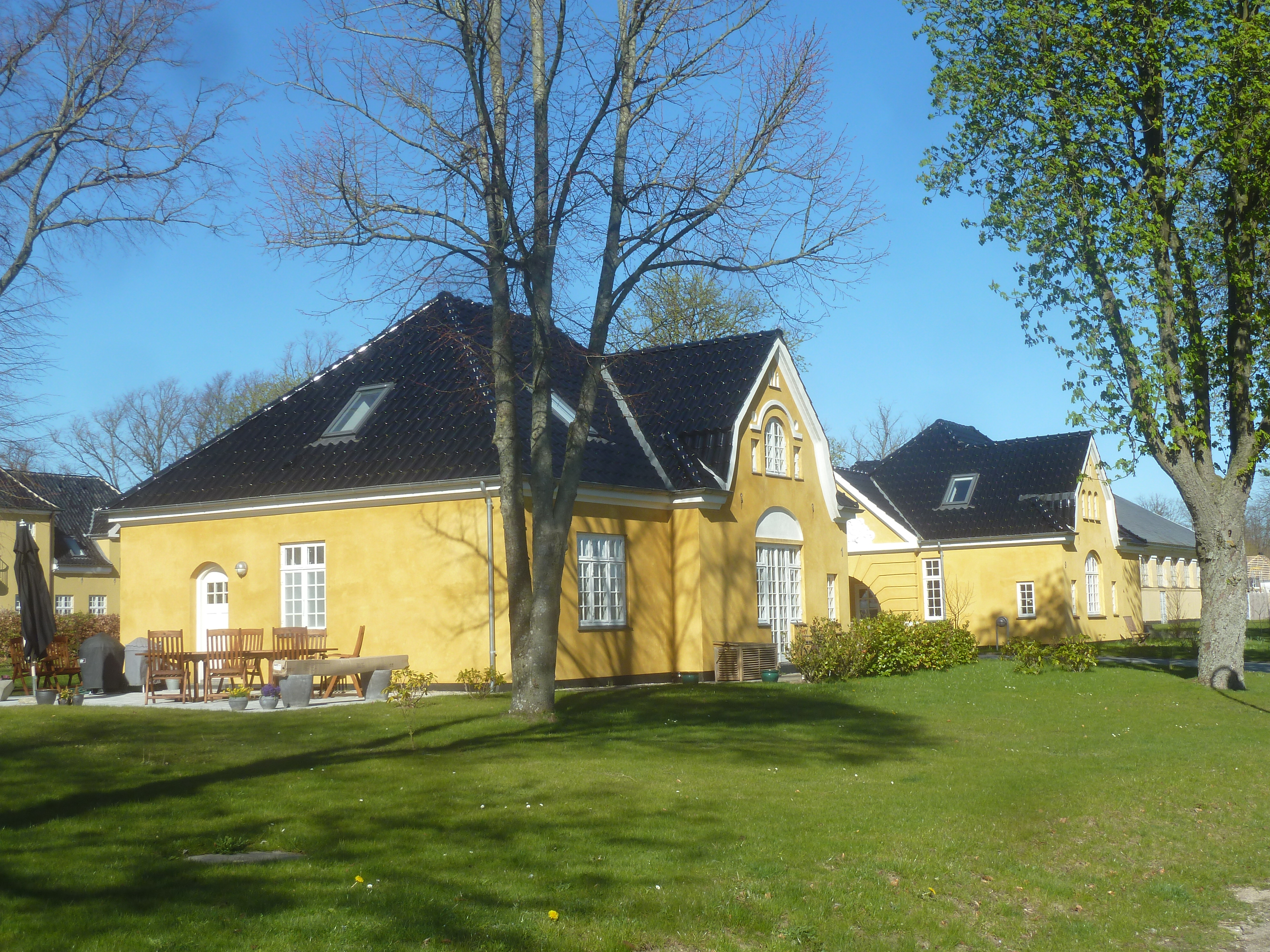
Buildings at Nordlejren

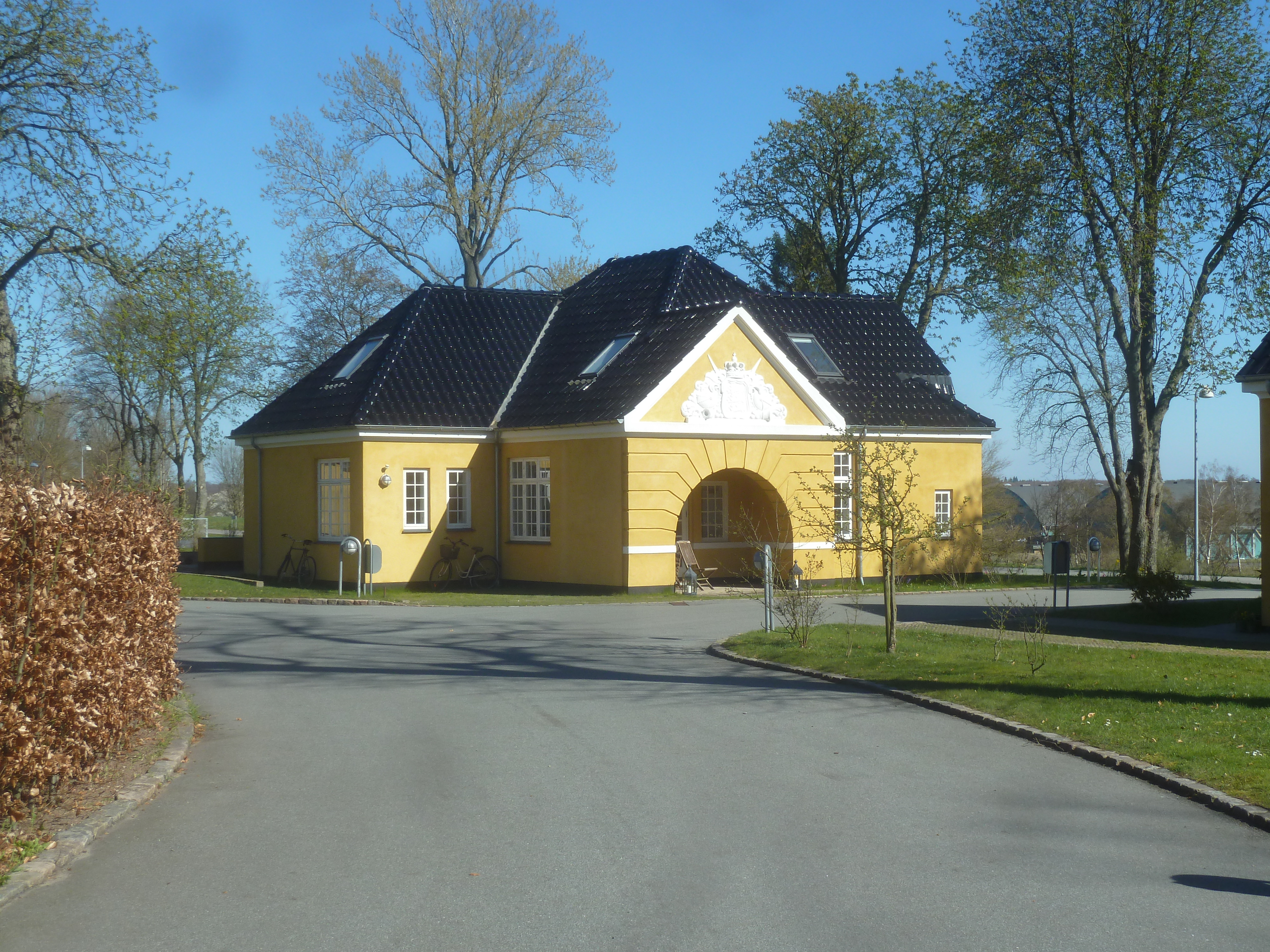
Former guardhouse, Nordlejren

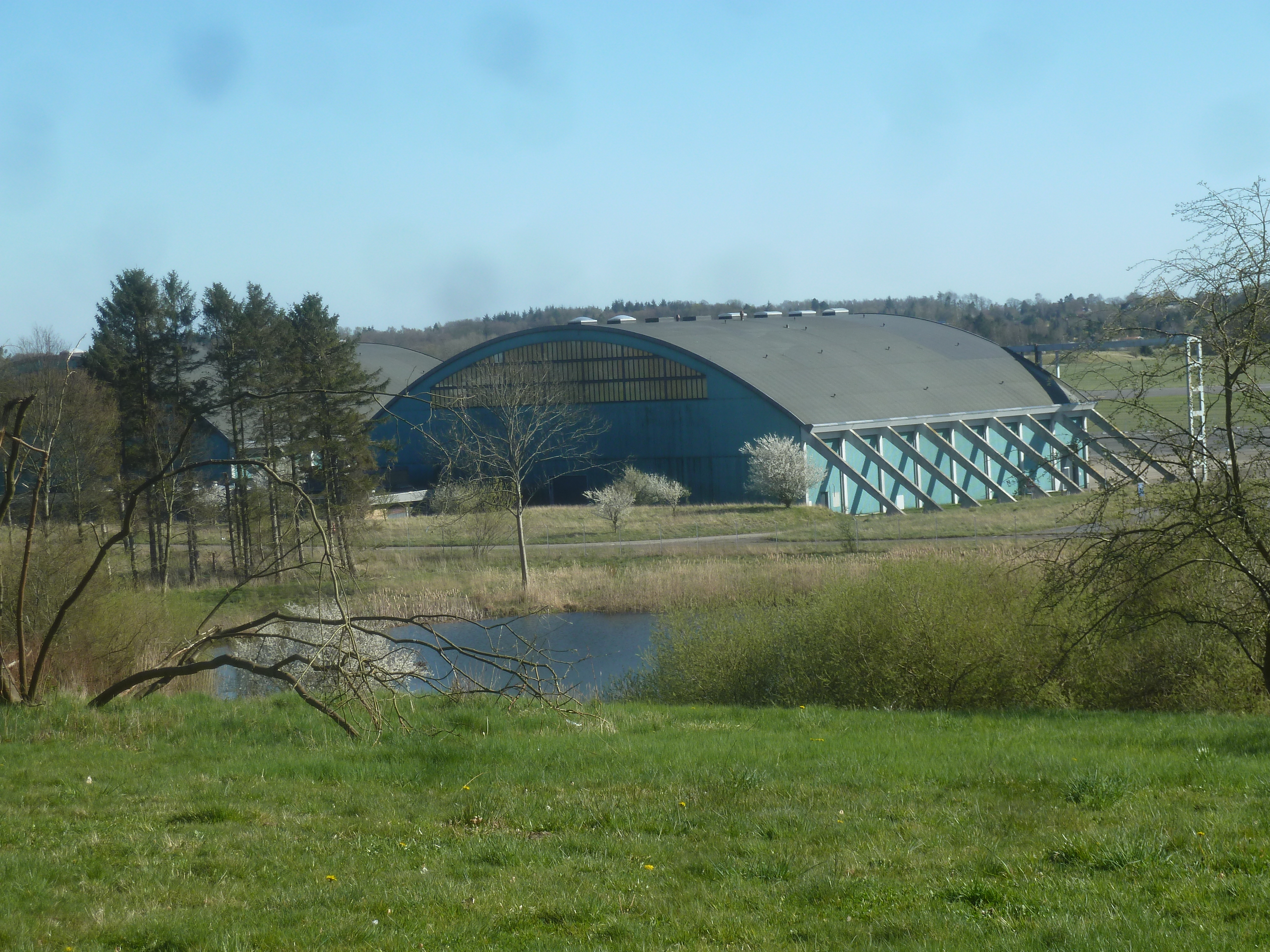
One of the old hangars

== Units ==
The following units that were based at Vaerloese Air Base at some point:

- 721 Squadron - arrived from Copenhagen Airport on 1 May 1956 and relocated to Aalborg Air Base on 1 April 2004, following base closure. It was equipped with the C-130 Hercules and Gulfstream III, flying the transport role.
- 722 Squadron - formed at the base on 8 January 1951 and relocated to Aalborg Air Base on 1 April 2004, following base closure. It was equipped with Sikorsky S-16A helicopters, flying the Search and Rescue role.
