= Royal Danish Air Force =

Air warfare branch of Denmark's armed forces

- Flyvevåbnet
- Badge of the Royal Danish Air Force
- Founded: 1 October 1950; 76 years ago
- Country: Denmark
- Type: Air force
- Role: Aerial warfare
- Size: 3,476 personnel + 100 conscripts 118 aircraft
- Part of: Danish Armed Forces
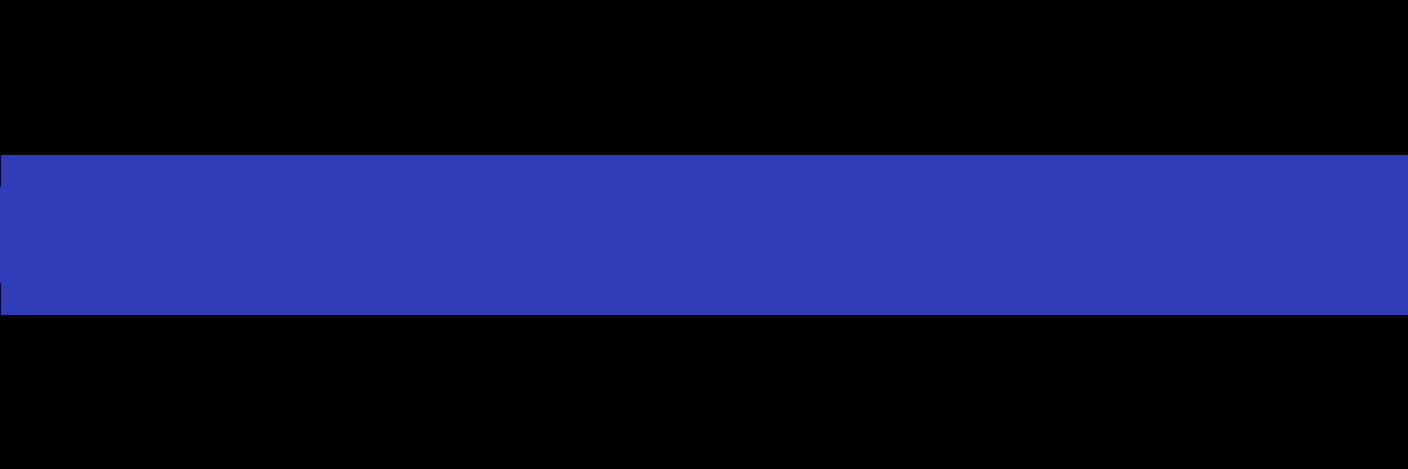
- Stable belt
- Engagements: NATO bombing of Yugoslavia; War in Afghanistan (2001–2021); Military intervention in Libya; Military intervention against ISIL
- Website: www.forsvaret.dk/da/organisation/flyvevaabnet/

Commanders
- Chief of the Air Command: Major General Jan Dam
- Chief Master Sergeant of the RDAF: Kristian Venø

Insignia
- Roundel

- Fin flash

Aircraft flown
- Fighter: F-35 Lightning II
- Helicopter: Sikorsky SH-60 Seahawk, Eurocopter Fennec, AgustaWestland EH101 Merlin
- Patrol: Bombardier CL-604 Challenger
- Trainer: Saab MFI-17 Supporter
- Transport: Lockheed Martin C-130J Super Hercules

The Royal Danish Air Force (Danish: Flyvevåbnet, lit. 'The Flying weapon') (RDAF) is the aerial warfare force of the Kingdom of Denmark and one of the four branches of the Danish Armed Forces. Initially being components of the Army and the Navy, it was made a separate service in 1950. Its main purpose is to serve as enforcer of Danish airspace and to provide air support to Danish group troops on the battlefield.

== History ==
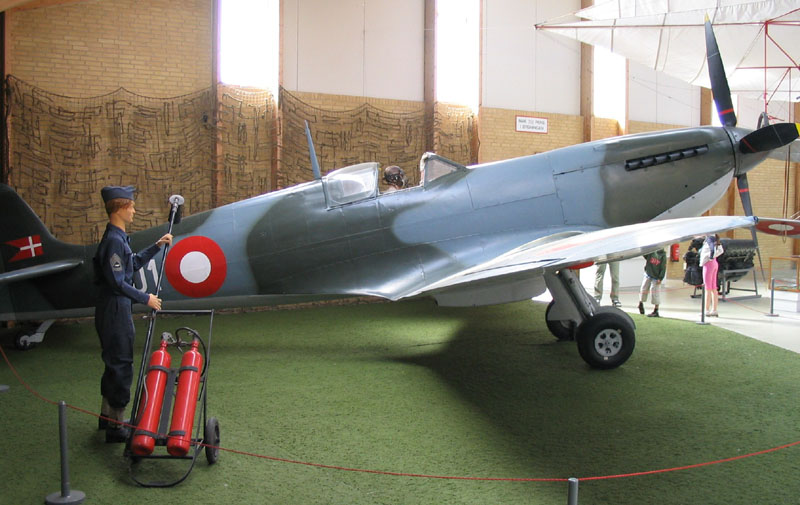
An RDAF Supermarine Spitfire on display at the Stauning Aircraft Museum

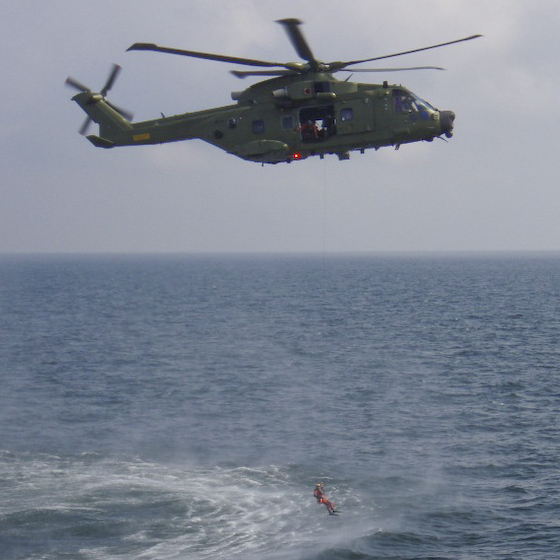
Danish Air Force EH-101 hoisting from waters

The Royal Danish Air Force (RDAF) was formed as a military service independent from the Royal Danish Army and Royal Danish Navy in 1950 from the merger of the Royal Danish Army Air Corps (Danish: Hærens Flyvertropper) founded on 2 July 1912 and the Royal Danish Naval Air Service (Danish: Marinens Flyvevæsen) which had been founded on 14 December 1911. All military aviation had been prohibited during the Nazi occupation from 1940 to 1945 and so as of V-E Day the Danish armed forces had no aircraft, but the Luftwaffe had built or expanded air bases in Denmark.

The first Chief of the air force was Lieutenant General Carl Christian Jacob Førslev, who had previously served as a colonel in the army and as first commander of the Danish Army Air Corps. The national command was located at Værløse Air Base which also served as Command East, while Command West was located at Air Base Karup in central Jutland. Royal Air Force volunteer and former member of the Free Norwegian Forces in England, Kaj Birksted, was appointed chief of the flying staff. The rivalries and mutual disrespect between the established officer Førslev, who had never been in air combat himself, and the experienced fighter ace Birksted led to a series of misunderstandings which delayed the operationalization of the air force. Further, the East and West commands lacked experience and knowledge of the newly delivered Gloster Meteor and F-84 Thunderjet aircraft.

The Danish armed forces received 38 surplus Supermarine Spitfire H. F. Mk. IXE and 3 P.R.Mk. XI in 1947–48 plus four additional airframes for ground instruction, which were operated by units of the Hærens Flyvertropper and Marinens Flyvevæsen prior to their merger, and by the Royal Danish Air Force until 1956, when the last examples were retired and all but two scrapped.

One survived for a number of years in a children's playground. The one surviving instructional airframe was later restored to depict the number '401' Spitfire Mk. IX. This airplane is now preserved at Dansk Veteranflysamling at Stauning Airfield in Jutland.

Pilot training was initially based at Avnø from May 1946 until 1951, when the school were transferred to the U.S. under the "Military Assistance Programme". The school at Avnø continued to conduct tests to choose the candidates for the American training programme. In 1947 the RDAF established a school for aircraft mechanics, based at Værløse Air Base. In 1951, the RDAF officers school was inaugurated at Rungstedlund north of Copenhagen, while airmen were educated at Værløse.

=== 1950s ===
The air force received six F-84E Thunderjet and 238 F-84G Thunderjet as military aid from the US, and formed five new squadrons (726 to 730) at Karup Air Base from 1952 to 1954. The rapid expansion caused problems as neither two-seaters nor flight simulators were available, causing 89 crashed F-84s and 40 pilot casualties. Some casualties were due to the lack of experience in the newly formed air force while others stemmed from the tactics introduced by American WWII and Korean War-veterans based on fast and low flying attacks to avoid anti-aircraft fire.

To avoid further casualties the air force established a training squadron of two-seated T-33As in 1956 to train US-educated pilots to navigate under local weather conditions. Furthermore, Eskadrille 722 was changed to function as rescue squadron in 1956 and was strengthened by seven Sikorsky S-55 helicopters in 1957. Finally, Air Chief Marshal Hugh Saunders from Royal Air Force was employed in 1954 to reorganize the air force which led to the merger of Command East and West, forming Flyvertaktisk Kommando (Air Tactical Command) with the initial mission to lower the number of crashes during training.

=== 1960s ===
In 1962, the Royal Danish Army's four SAM batteries based on Nike missiles were transferred to the air force. They were intended to defend Copenhagen against Soviet ballistic missiles and high altitude bombers, and based at Eskadrille 531 in Gunderød, Eskadrille 532 at Kongelunden on Amager, Eskadrille 533 in Sigerslev and Eskadrille 534 in Tune. In 1965 four batteries of Hawk missiles were deployed close to the Nike batteries to protect them from low altitude aircraft.

In 1968, Denmark became the first of three export customers for the Saab 35 Draken (Kite/Dragon). Ever since 1966 the Danish government had started looking for an aircraft to replace two squadrons of Republic RF-84F Thunderflash reconnaissance aircraft and North American F-100 Super Sabre fighter/ground attacker aircraft. A number of candidates were considered and these were: the Douglas A-4F Skyhawk, Northrop F-5 Freedom Fighter, Vought A-7 Corsair II, Lockheed F-104 Starfighter, Dassault Mirage III/5 and Saab's Draken. The F-5 and Mirage 5 were the favourites while the Draken was one of the least popular since it had poor payload/range performance and could not carry heavy weapon loads. In response to the Kongelige Danske Flyvevåben's (Royal Danish Air Force's) initial dislike, Saab decided to create a new Draken variant that would put it on the top of the competition shortlist.

=== 1970s ===
In the 1960s and 1970s, the RDAF operated a number of US financed Lockheed F-104G Starfighters, North American F-100D and F-100F Super Sabres, and several other types.

The first Danish Draken, designated F35, delivery took place on 1 September 1970 when three F35s were delivered to Karup Air Base. They were later followed by another 17 F35s and six TF35s. Since the F35s lacked radar, they replaced F-100Ds in the ground attack role. However, Sidewinder AAMS could be carried for self-defence. The six trainers were delivered between 1970 and 1972 and the F35s were delivered between 1970 and 1971.

In 1971, the Danish army created the Royal Danish Army Flying Service as the first air-unit outside the air force, since its creation in 1950. It had observation helicopters and piston-engined artillery spotting aeroplanes. In 1977 the Danish Naval Air Squadron was extracted from squadron 722 to the Danish navy, and it had ship-based helicopters. In a joint arms purchase four NATO countries: Denmark, Norway, Netherlands, and Belgium introduced the General Dynamics F-16 Fighting Falcon as their common strike fighter in January 1980. The F-16 was later bought by additional NATO countries, Greece and Turkey, and the United States of America, also a NATO member operates the F-16.

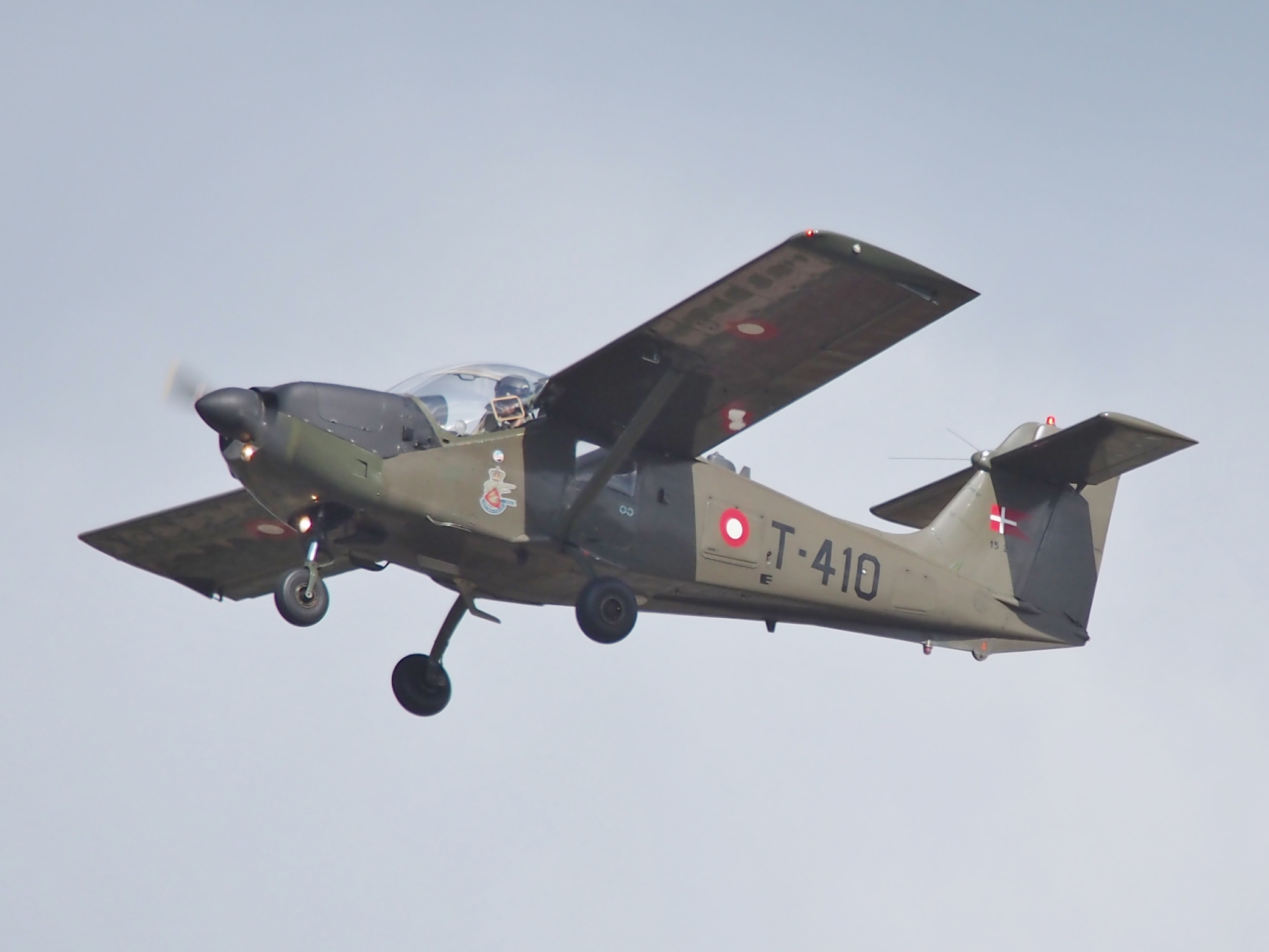
T-17 Supporter at RIAT 2010

=== 1980s ===
In 1982, the number of fighter aircraft was reduced by 12 units. The General Dynamics F-16 was introduced to replace initially the F-100 and later the F-104G. The Royal Danish Naval Air Service was strengthened by eight Westland Lynx Mk. 80 from 1980, replacing the Alouette III helicopters. As a supplement to the Greenland-based C-130s the air force purchased three Gulfstream G-III.

=== 1990s ===
In 1990, the Danish Army Air Corps purchased 12 Eurocopter Fennec lightweight attack helicopters to strengthen capabilities to perform expeditionary mission. The helicopters were transferred to RDAF in 2003.

In 1992, during the Yugoslavian civil wars, the RDAF C-130 Hercules aircraft were used for transport of the 900 Danish troops participating in the UN-led mission to the Balkans. In 1996, a C-130 joined the NATO On-Call International Airlift Pool along with a Gulfstream aircraft. The Gulfstreams were replaced by Challenger planes the following year, when the Danish government ordered the three Challengers in current use.

In 1999, following the end of the Cold War, the Danish air force was re-organised to be an "expeditionary" air force, capable of supporting international operations worldwide – but at the same time still being able to uphold its domestic air and seaward defence commitments. The same year, an expeditionary force of six F-16s to join the Operation Allied Force is approved in parliament.

=== 2000s ===
In 2002, Denmark joined the F-35 Joint Strike Fighter Team, and eventually up to 48 F-35s could be bought to replace the F-16s.

In October 2002, a tri-national detachment of 18 Danish, Dutch, and Norwegian F-16 fighter-bombers, with one Dutch KC-10 tanker, flew to the Manas Air Base in Kyrgyzstan, in support of the NATO ground forces in Afghanistan as part of the Operation Enduring Freedom.

In 2004, the older C-130H Hercules fleet of three transport aircraft (bought by the government in 1973) was replaced by three of the more-advanced and stretched C-130J transport aircraft. A fourth C-130J joined in 2007.

In 2005, a modification program (Mid Life Update) was completed on the remaining F-16 aircraft. The modification programme, started in 1995, introduced a new mission computer, colour multifunction displays, and other avionic improvements.

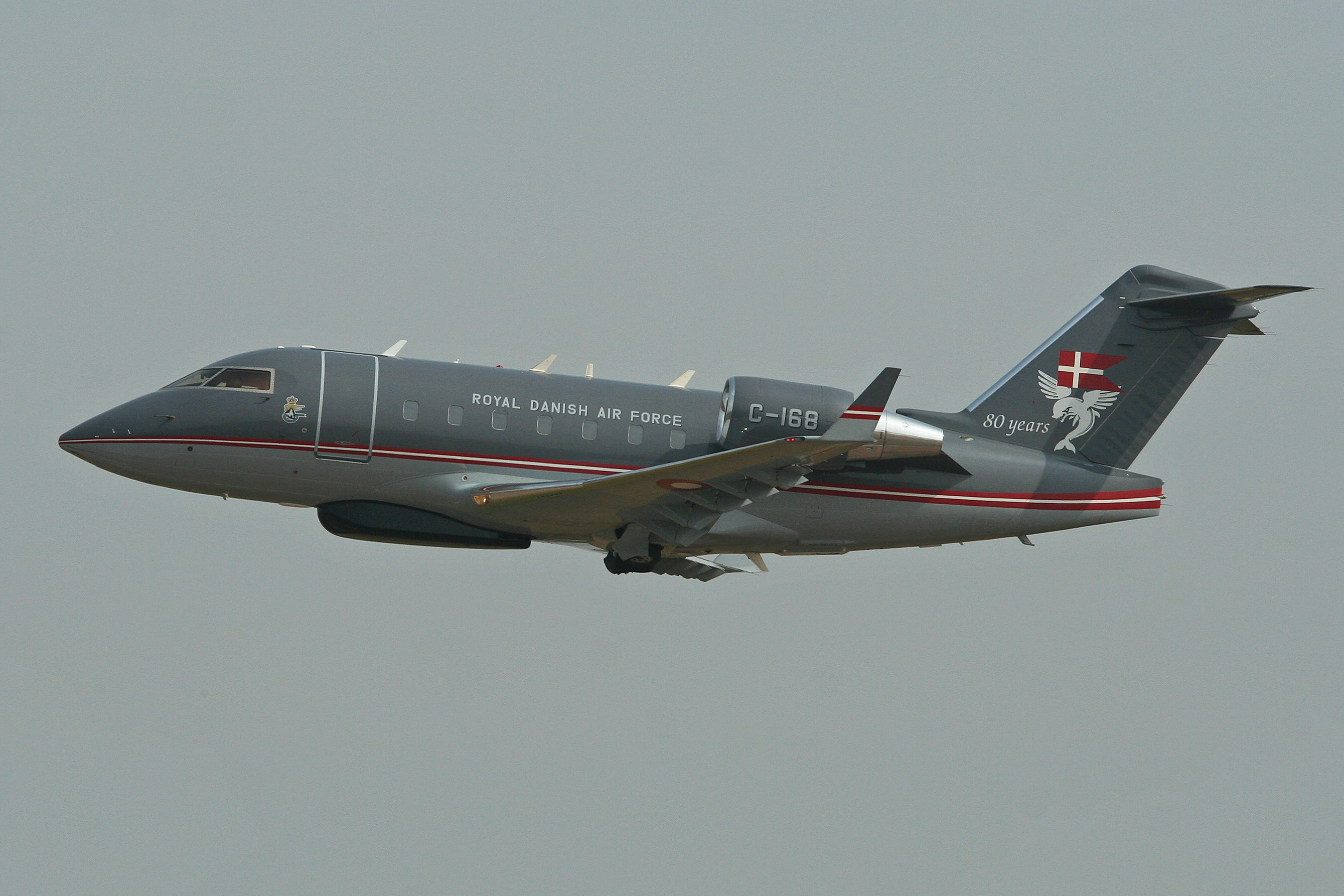
Bombardier Challenger CL-604 at RIAT 2010

In 2003, 16 H-500 Cayuse and 13 Eurocopter AS550C2 Fennec from the Army Air Corps and eight Westland Lynx Mk. 90B from the Naval Air Squadron were supposed to be transferred to the air force. The 16 Cayuse and 13 Fennec helicopters were transferred to the newly re-formed Danish Squadron 724. The eight Lynx helicopters were supposed to enter another re-formed squadron, Squadron 728, but for political reasons those helicopters remained with the Navy. This change of "ownership" of the naval helicopters became effective on 1 January 2011 when the naval helicopters joined the newly formed Squadron 723.

In 2005, the 16 Cayuses were decommissioned, and also one of the Fennecs. The remaining 12 Fennecs took over many of the tasks from the Cayuses, including support-functions of the Danish police.

In 2006, the air force signed a letter of intent to purchase several of the Boeing Integrated Defense C-17 Globemaster III. That order needs to be confirmed, but it is to be made on the basis of the formation of a shared NATO C-17 air fleet to support international deployments. Denmark has later withdrawn from this arrangement but it is in existence today. See NATO Strategic Airlift Capability. The United States and the United Kingdom have already bought numerous C-17s, and several other NATO countries are considering doing so, too. In June 2007, Denmark's six EH101 transport helicopters were transferred to the British Royal Air Force to meet an urgent British requirement for additional transport helicopters. In 2009 six replacement EH-101 were delivered to the RDAF from AgustaWestland Yeovil and paid for by the UK.

=== 2010s ===
In June 2010, the Sikorsky S-61 SAR helicopter was withdrawn from service.

The Danish Defence Acquisition and Logistics Organization (DALO), short listed five helicopters as potential replacements for the Lynx with around 12 new naval helicopters needed. The Sikorsky/Lockheed MH-60R, the NH90/NFH, H-92, AW159 and EH-101 were on the short list and a Request For Proposal was issued on 30 September 2010. Ultimately the air force decided to buy nine Sikorsky SH-60 Seahawk helicopters.

In 2014, RDAF flew F-16 fighter jets in Greenland for the first time, testing the operational capabilities of maintaining sovereignty of the vast arctic airspace.

In 2005 the RDAF requested information about the possible procurement of a replacement for the F-16 fighter aircraft from the producers of the Gripen, Rafale, Eurofighter and Joint Strike Fighter, to which the RDAF has been a partner since 1997. Due to this fact Rafale-producer, Dassault Aviation, decided not to participate in the information round as they considered it to be biased towards the JSF option. This also led to the withdrawal of the Eurofighter in 2007, reentering in 2012. Meanwhile, the Boeing F-18 Super Hornet entered the competition in 2008. After several delays, a request for binding information was sent to the four candidates in April 2014 expecting a final decision in mid-2015. On 9 June 2016, the Danish Defence Committee agreed to purchase 27 F-35As to succeed the F-16. The price tag is US$3 billion.

=== 2020s ===
In January 2020, Lockheed Martin announced that assembly had begun on L-001, the first of 27 F-35As destined for the Royal Danish Air Force. The first F-35 was transferred to the Danish Air Force on 7 April 2021 (the aircraft remained in USA for training).

On 14 September 2023, the first four F-35A fighters arrived at Skrydstrup air base after a transfer flight from Lockheed Martin's facilities in the US.

On 6 December 2024, another four F-35A fighters were delivered to the Danish Fighter Wing at Skrydstrup Air Base after departing from the US.

In June 2025, the air force announced its intention to join the NATO MMF fleet with a requested capacity of 2 Airbus A330 MRTT, scheduled for delivery in 2028 and 2029.

In October 2025, Denmark approved the purchase of 16 additional F-35A, raising its planned fleet to 43 units to strengthen national and Arctic defense capabilities. The acquisition also includes infrastructure, training, and maintenance support, with future integration of Collaborative Combat Aircraft (CCA) drones alongside the F-35s.

On 18 January 2026, the Royal Danish Air Force officially retired the F-16, marking the end of Denmark's F-16 operations at Skrydstrup Air Base. The withdrawal coincided with Denmark's full transition to the F-35A fighters.

== Organization ==
=== Organization in the late 1980s ===
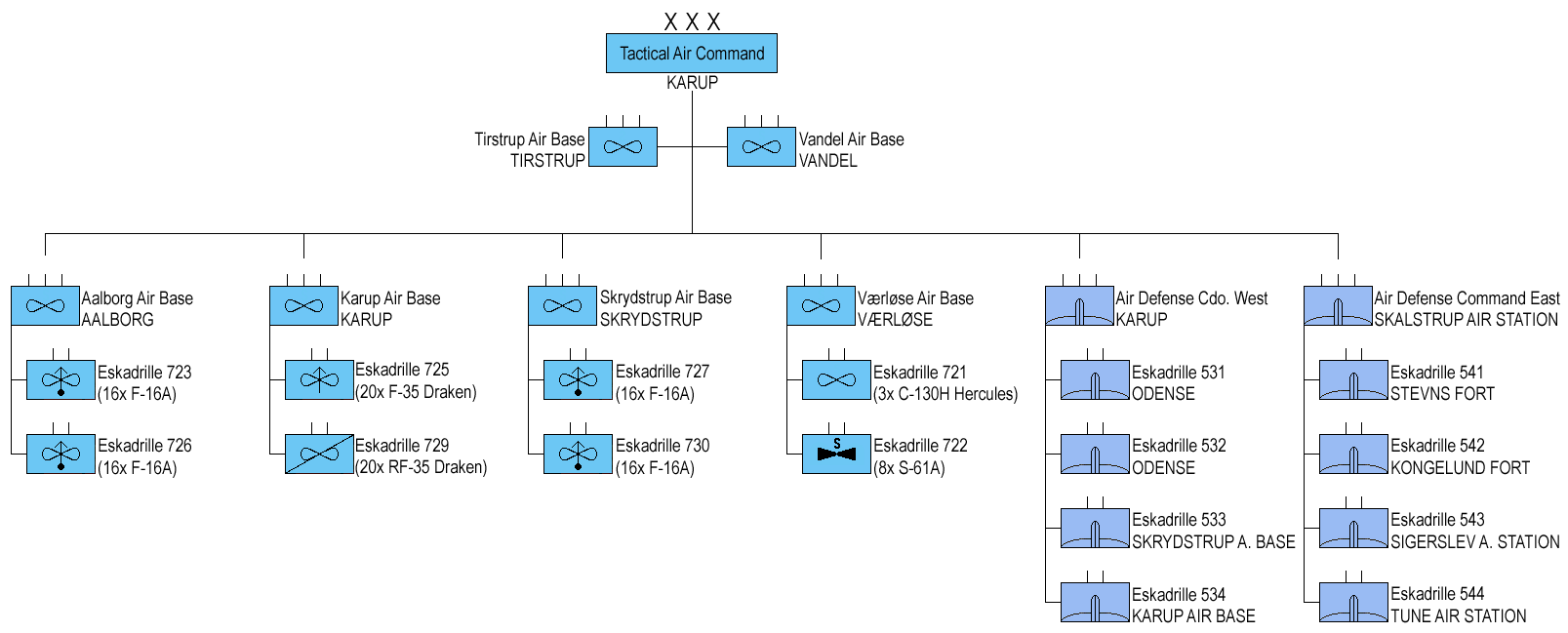
Structure of the Tactical Air Command in 1989 (click to enlarge)

The Royal Danish Air Force Command was headquartered at Karup Air Base and tasked to train, maintain and prepare the army for war. However operational control in peacetime rested with the Tactical Air Command. In wartime the air force's commander would have become the commander of Allied Air Forces Baltic Approaches (AIRBALTAP). AIRBALTAP commanded all flying units, flying reinforcements, all ground-based radar systems and stations, all air defence units and airfields in its sector. In war the entire Royal Danish Air Force would have come under AIRBALTAP.

Royal Danish Air Force bases in 1989

In 1989 the Royal Danish Air Force consisted of the following units:

- Royal Danish Air Force, in Karup, commanded by a Danish lieutenant general
  - Flyveskolen (Basic Flying School), Avnø Air Base, T-17 Supporter
  - Air Force Materiel Command, Karup
    - Air Force Depot Service
    - Air Force Maintenance Service
    - Air Force Ammunition Arsenal
  - Tactical Air Command, Karup
    - Aalborg Air Base
      - Eskadrille 723, F-16A
      - Eskadrille 726, F-16A
    - Karup Air Base
      - Eskadrille 725, F-35 Draken, TF-35 Draken
      - Eskadrille 729, Reconnaissance, RF-35 Draken, TF-35 Draken
    - Tirstrup Air Base
      - Co-located Operating Base to be reinforced by U.S. Air Force / Royal Air Force squadrons
    - Vandel Air Base
      - Co-located Operating Base to be reinforced by U.S. Air Force / Royal Air Force squadrons
    - Skrydstrup Air Base
      - Eskadrille 727, F-16A
      - Eskadrille 730, F-16A
    - Værløse Air Base
      - Eskadrille 721, Transport, C-130H Hercules, Gulfstream III
      - Eskadrille 722, Search and rescue, S-61A helicopters
  - Air Defence Command East, Skalstrup Air Station
    - Eskadrille 541, Stevns Fort, with 1x I-Hawk battery (6x launchers)
    - Eskadrille 542, Kongelund Fort near Aflangshagen Air Station, with 1x I-Hawk battery (6x launchers)
    - Eskadrille 543, Sigerslev Air Station, with 1x I-Hawk battery (6x launchers)
    - Eskadrille 544, Tune near Skalstrup Air Station, with 1x I-Hawk battery (6x launchers)
  - Air Defence Command West, Karup
    - Eskadrille 531, Odense, with 1x I-Hawk battery (6x launchers)
    - Eskadrille 532, Odense, with 1x I-Hawk battery (6x launchers)
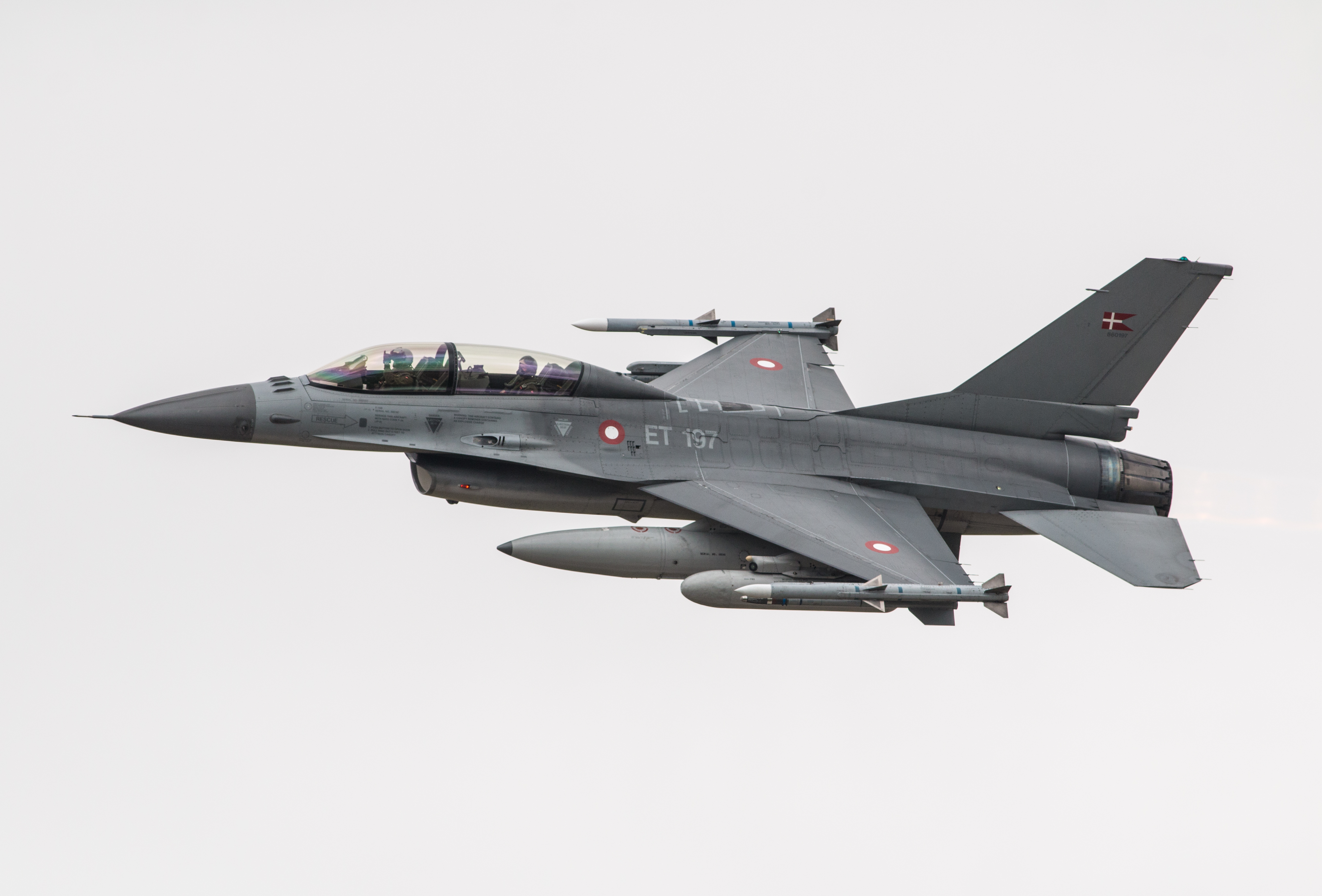
      An RDAF F-16BM on climb out
    - Eskadrille 533, Skrydstrup Air Base, with 1x I-Hawk battery (6x launchers)
    - Eskadrille 534, Karup Air Base, with 1x I-Hawk battery (6x launchers)
  - Air Control Command, at Vedbæk Air Station
    - Radar Station on Bornholm, with fixed S-723 radar
    - Rader Station in Gripskov
    - Radar Station at Skovhuse
    - Radar Station in Skagen, with fixed RAT-31DL radar
    - Radar Station on Skrydstrup Air Base, with two mobile AN/TPS-77 radars
    - Radar Station, at Sornfelli, Faroe Islands*

=== Organization 2025 ===
Royal Danish Air Force bases 2025:
Fighter Wing Air Transport Wing Air Defence Wing
Helicopter Wing, Air Control Wing, Operations Support Wing
Radar station (Sornfelli on Streymoy off map in the Faroe Islands)

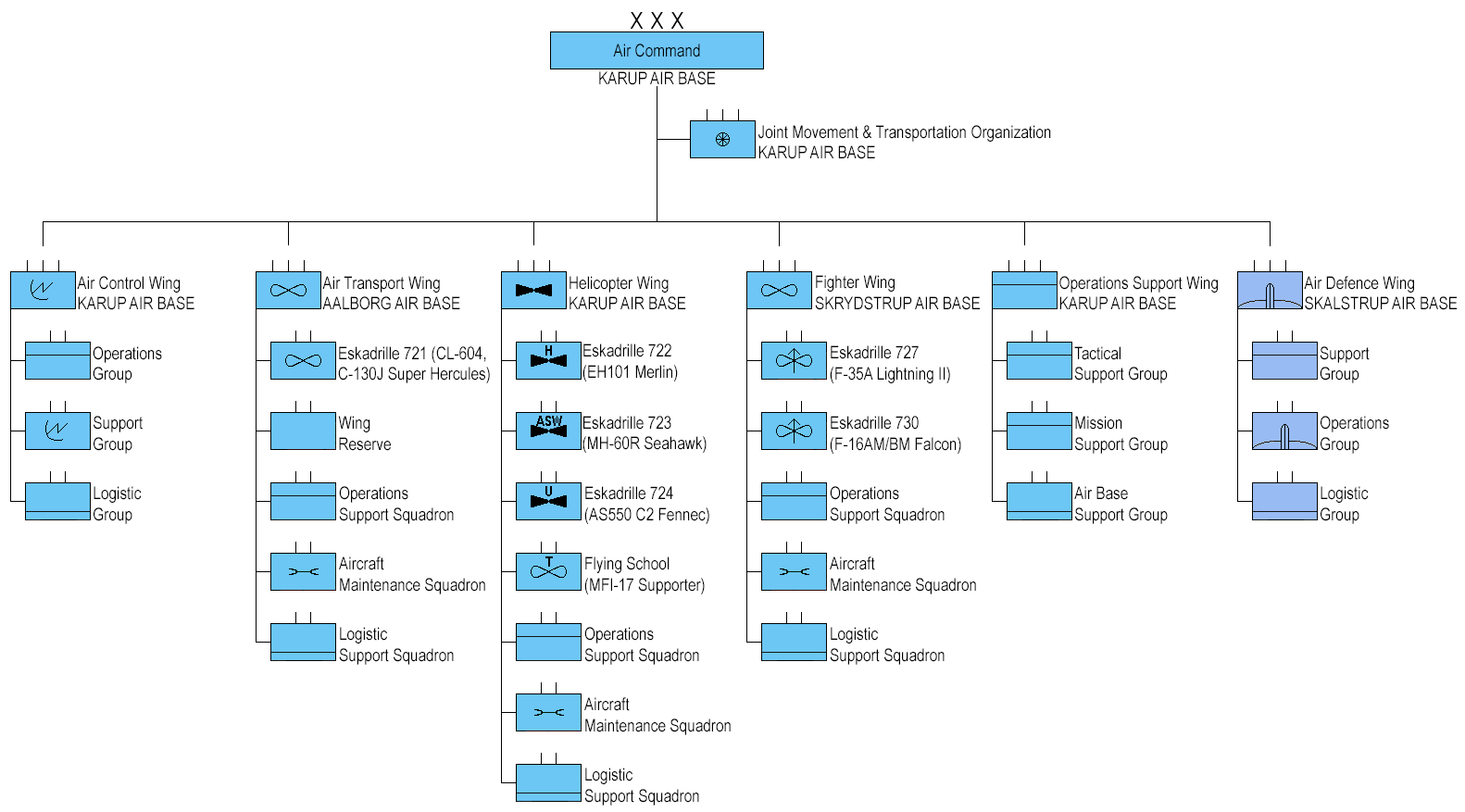
Air Command organization 2025 (click to enlarge)

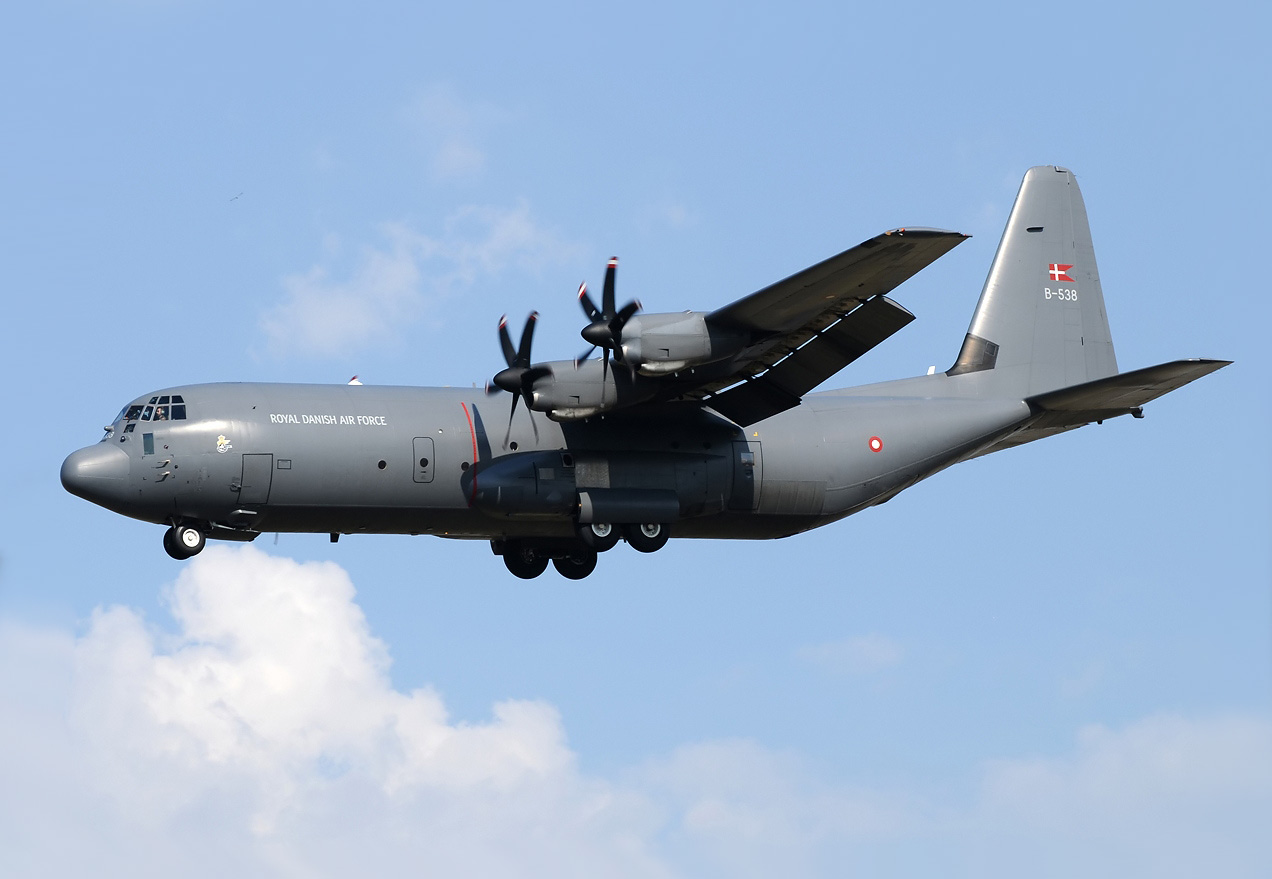
A Lockheed C-130J-30

- Air Command Denmark, at Karup Air Base
  - Joint Movement and Transportation Organization (JMTO), at Karup Air Base
  - Prince's Music Corps, originally from the army's Prince's Life Regiment
  - Air Control Wing, at Karup Air Base
    - Operations Group
      - Control and Reporting Centre Karup (CRC Karup), reports to NATO's Integrated Air Defense System CAOC Uedem in Germany
      - Eskadrille 515, at Copenhagen Airport (tasked with coordinating civil and military air traffic in Danish airspace)
      - Mobile Air Control Centre
    - Support Group
      - Radar Station Skrydstrup, at Skrydstrup Air Base, with two mobile AN/TPS-77 radars
      - Radar Station Skagen, on Skagen island, with RAT-31DL (will be replaced by AN/TPY-4)
      - Radar Station Bornholm, in Almindingen on Bornholm island, with Marconi S-723 (will be replaced by AN/TPY-4)
      - Radar Station Sornfelli, on Streymoy island, (closed in 2010, will reopen and equipped with AN/TPY-4)
    - Logistic Group
  - Air Transport Wing, at Aalborg Air Base
    - Eskadrille 721, with 4× C-130J-30 Super Hercules, 4× CL-604 (Airborne Surveillance)
    - Eskadrille 729, to be equipped with MQ-9B SeaGuardian long-range unmanned aircraft from 2028
    - Wing Reserve
    - Operations Support Squadron
    - Aircraft Maintenance Squadron
    - Logistic Support Squadron
  - Helicopter Wing, at Karup Air Base
    - Eskadrille 722, with 14× EH101 Merlin (3× EH101 detached to Aalborg, Skrydstrup, and Skalstrup on 24/7 Search and Rescue duty)
    - Eskadrille 723, with 9× MH-60R Seahawk
    - Eskadrille 724, with 11× AS550 C2 Fennec
    - Flying School, with MFI-17 Supporter
    - Operations Support Squadron
    - Aircraft Maintenance Squadron
    - Logistic Support Squadron
  - Fighter Wing, at Skrydstrup Air Base
    - Eskadrille 727, with F-35A Lightning II
    - Eskadrille 730, (will be equipped with F-35A Lightning II)
    - Operations Support Squadron
    - Aircraft Maintenance Squadron
    - Logistic Support Squadron
  - Operations Support Wing, at Karup Air Base
    - Tactical Support Group
    - Mission Support Group
    - Air Base Support Group
  - Air Defence Wing, at Skalstrup Air Base (activated 26 March 2025)
    - Operations Group
    - Eskadrille 541, with NASAMS 3
    - Support Group
    - Logistic Group

== Operations (Incomplete) ==
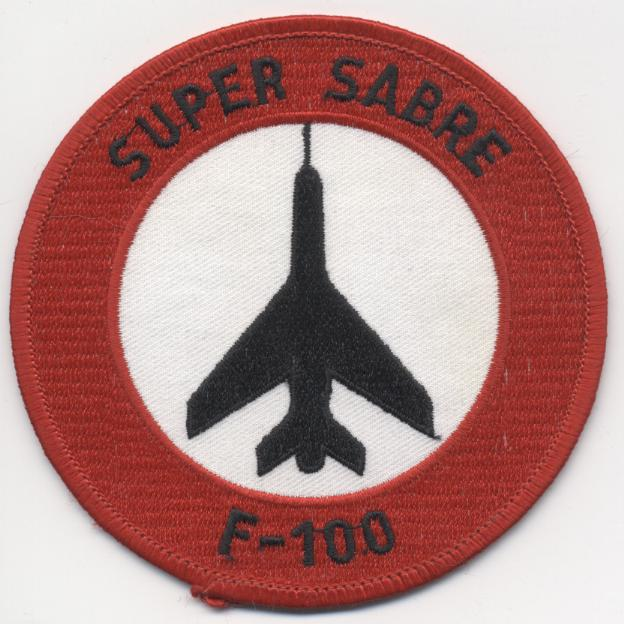

- From 1960 to 1964 RDAF S-55 helicopters flew missions for UNOC in the Congolese civil war.
- In 1999, 9 F-16 fighters flew sorties over Serbia from Grazzanise AB, Italy as part of Operation Allied Force.
- In 2002 and 2003, 6 F-16 fighter bombers flew 743 sorties against Taliban and al-Qaeda in Afghanistan from Ganci AB, Kyrgyzstan during Operation Enduring Freedom.
- From July to October 2004, 4 F-16 fighters in Šiauliai, Lithuania, was Denmark's contribution to NATO's Operation Baltic Air Policing. The air policing mission was also undertaken by Danish F-16s in 2009, 2011 and 2013
- In 2005 three AS550C2 Fennec helicopters were deployed to Iraq for two months to assist the Danish ground forces during the first free elections in the country. In 2007 four Fennecs again deployed to Iraq, this time mainly to provide airborne reconnaissance for convoys on the ground around Basra. The helicopters completed 354 missions before returning home in December 2007.
- 4 AS550C2 Fennec helicopters belonging to the 724th Squadron of the Helicopter Wing were deployed to Afghanistan on 11 June 2008. These helicopters were based at Camp Bastion, northwest of Lashkar Gar, the capital of Helmand province, and were assigned to provide high altitude observation for Danish ground forces, as well as light transport.
- From 19 March 2011, 6 F-16 aircraft from Fighter Wing Skrydstrup were deployed to Naval Air Station Sigonella on Sicily to assist in maintaining the no-fly zone over Libya as part of the 2011 coalition intervention in Libya.
- From 11 July 2014, 3 EH-101 Merlin helicopters were deployed to Afghanistan. One suffered extensive damage when it rolled over during landing on 11 October 2014. No casualties.
- From 5 October 2014, seven F-16AM from Eskadrille 727 and 730 from Skrydstrup Airbase (Fighter Wing Skrydstrup) and 140 Danish personnel – ground crew and pilots – based at Ahmad al-Jaber Air Base in Kuwait to fight the Islamic State forces (ISIS / ISIL) as part of Operation Inherent Resolve.

== Equipment ==
=== Aircraft ===
==== Current inventory ====
Aircraft	Origin	Type	Variant	In service	Notes
Combat aircraft
F-35 Lightning II	United States	Stealth swing-role strike fighter	F-35A	21+6 trainers (+16 on order)	27 ordered initially, 6 used for training at Luke AFB. 16 additional ordered in 2026.
Maritime patrol
Challenger 604	Canada	Patrol / Surveillance / Liaison	CL-604	4	
P-8 Poseidon	United States	Maritime patrol	P-8A	0 (+2 on order)	
Transport
C-130J Super Hercules	United States	Tactical airlifter	C-130J-30	4	
Helicopters
AS550 Fennec	France	Utility	AS550C2	11	
SH-60 Seahawk	United States	ASW / SAR	MH-60R	9	Flown for the Danish Navy.
EH-101	Italy; United Kingdom	SAR / Transport	Mk.512	14	
Trainer aircraft
MFI-17 Supporter	Sweden	Basic trainer		25	
UAV
General Atomics MQ-9 Reaper	United States	UCAV	MQ-9B SkyGuardian	0 (+4 on order)	

==== Shared fleet ====
Aircraft	Origin	Type	Operators	Variant	In service	Notes
Aerial refueling
Airbus A330 MRTT; Multi-Role Tanker Transport	France; Germany; Spain; United Kingdom	Tanker, transporter, medical evacuation aircraft	MMF; Multinational MRTT Fleet (Belgium; Czech Republic; Denmark; Finland; Germany; Luxembourg; Netherlands; Norway; Sweden)	A330-200 MRTT	9 (+3 on order)	Based at the Eindhoven Air Base in the Netherlands. History of the programme (nations joining and aircraft orders): July 2016, multinational fleet created by the Netherlands and Luxembourg, 2 aircraft ordered.; September 2017, Germany and Norway join the fleet, 5 aircraft ordered.; February 2018, Belgium joins the fleet, 1 aircraft ordered.; September 2020, 1 aircraft ordered, Luxembourg expands its participation.; March 2023, 1 aircraft ordered, Belgium expands its participation.; June 2025, Denmark and Sweden join the fleet, 2 aircraft ordered.; July 2026, Finland joins the fleet. The first aircraft entered service in June 2020, the ninth in February 2025).
A330 MRTT MEDEVAC kit	Europe	MEDEVAC kit	MMF; Multinational MRTT Fleet (Belgium; Czech Republic; Denmark; Finland; Germany; Luxembourg; Netherlands; Norway; Sweden)	–	1	One of the MRTT aircraft of the Multinational MRTT Fleet comes with the MEDEVAC kits. Kit with: 6 ICU, 16 stretchers and 21 chairs for medical support.
Reconnaissance and survaillance
Northrop Grumman RQ-4 Global Hawk	United States	UCAV / HALE / ISR	NISRF / NAGSF (Bulgaria; Czech Republic; Denmark; Estonia; Germany; Italy; Latvia; Lithuania; Luxembourg; Norway; Poland; Romania; Slovakia; Slovenia; United Kingdom; United States)	RQ-4D Phoenix	5	

=== Air defence ===
==== Temporarily leased system ====
Model	Image	Origin	Type	Variant	In service	Notes
NASAMS fire units
NASAMS (Kongsberg Defence & Aerospace )		Norway; United States	Short to medium range SAM	NASAMS 3	1	Lease of the NASAMS fire unit: July 2025, lease contract signed between the DALO and the Forsvarsmateriell for a fire unit, to be used as a stop-gap measure, as Denmark was selecting the future fire units, and until these enter service.; July 2026, the leased fire unit became operational.
NASAMS elements
AIM-120 AMRAAM		United States; Norway	Radar homing, medium range, SAM	AMI-120C-8	–	
AIM-9 Sidewinder		United States; Norway	IR homing, medium range, SAM	AIM-9X block II	–	
Multi-Missile Launcher (Kongsberg Defence & Aerospace)		Norway	Semi-mobile missile launcher	MML Mk2	N/A	
Fire Distribution Center (Kongsberg Defence & Aerospace)		Norway	Fire control system	–	1	One per fire unit.
AN/MPQ-64 Sentinel (Raytheon)		United States	Mobile, X-band (IEEE), pulse doppler, 3D, surveillance and fire-control radar	AN/MPQ-64F1	1	One per fire unit.
MSP (Rheinmetall)	(illustration)	Germany	Passive EO/IR sensor	MSP 500, or MSP 600	1	One per fire unit.

==== Air surveillance ====
Model	Image	Origin	Type	Variant	In service	Notes
Stationary radars
Martello S723 (Alenia Marconi Systems)	(Left tower)	United Kingdom	L-band (IEEE), solid-state, planar phased-array, 3D, early warning radar	–	1	Radar to be replaced. Range: 470 km (250 nmi).
RAT-31DL (Selex)		Italy	L-band (IEEE), AESA, 3D, early warning radar	–	1	Radar to be replaced. Range: 470 km (250 nmi).
Mobile radars
TPS-77 (Lockheed Martin)	(illustration)	United States	L-band (IEEE), AESA, 3D, early warning radar	–	2	The radars were modernised in 2023. Range: 470 km (250 nmi).
RAC 3D (Thales Nederland)	(illustration)	Netherlands	C-band (IEEE), planar phased-array, PESA, 3D, short range surveillance radar	–	4	Radars to be replaced by the Thales GM200 MM/C. Range: 100 km (54 nmi).
Airport surveillance radars
PSR 2D (Indra Sistemas)	(illustration)	Spain	S-band (IEEE), 2D, primary surveillance radar, and monopulse secondary surveillance radar	–	3	Installed in Aalborg, Karup and Skrydstrup.

=== Operational equipment for aircraft ===
Model	Image	Origin	Type	Variant	In service	Notes
Deployment systems
Deployerbare containermoduler til F-35	–	Denmark	Container modules for F-35 operations	–	–	Deployment kit for the F-35 based on container modules. It is designed to be facilities for pilots, mechanics and command to plan the missions, to have briefings.
UNIC URW-706	–	Japan	Mini-crawler telescopic crane	–	–	

=== Vehicles ===
Aircraft	Image	Origin	Type	Variant	In service	Notes
Fire fighting vehicles
E-One Eagle 6		United States	Airport crash tender	–	–	Entered service in 2001. Being replaced by the Panther 6×6.
Rosenbauer; Panther 6×6		Austria	Airport crash tender	–	16	Entered service in 2025. Option for 8 additional ones included in the contract.
Nissan Navara	Illustration (same colour and generation)	Japan	Firefighting command vehicle	–	–	
Trucks
Scania L-series 6×4	(Illustration)	Sweden	Low entry truck		3	
Scania P280 B4×2LB	(Illustration)	Sweden	Support fighter jet trucks	–	5	

== Future equipment ==
=== Air defence ===
==== Air defence systems ====
Aircraft	Image	Origin	Type	Variant	On order	Notes
Medium to long range fire units
SAMP/T (Eurosam)		France; Italy	Medium to long range SAM, ABM	SAMP/T NG	2	Selected in September 2025. To be used for area defence of cities and critical infrastructure. System to enter service in 2028. Fire unit consists of: Radar identification module: 1 × Ground Fire 300; Engagement module: 1 × ME-NG; Electric generator: 1 × MGE-NG; Launchers: up to 8 × launchers; Aster 30 launchers; Weapons: Aster 30B1; Aster 30B1NT; Direct support unit: Missile reloading; Electronic Workshop Shelter; Mechanical Workshop Shelter; Spare-parts Warehouse Shelter
Short to medium range fire units
IRIS-T SL (Diehl Defence)		Germany	Short to medium range SAM	IRIS-T SLM	–	Orders of fire units: 1 × fire unit in July 2025; undisclosed quantity ordered in December 2025; additional fire units (unknown quantity) ordered in December 2025; Fire unit consists of: Radar: 1 × Hensoldt TRML-4D; Fire control station: 1 × Airbus Defence Fortion IBMS-FC; Launching station: 3 × TEL; Weapons: IRIS-T SLM; Up to 11 × fire unit planned to be ordered. First delivery planned in 2026 / 2027.
VL MICA (MBDA France)		France	Short to medium range SAM	–	2	Orders of fire units: 1 × fire unit in July 2025; 1 × fire unit in December 2025; Fire unit consists of: Radar: 1 × Thales GM200 MM/A; Fire control station: 1 × TOC; Launching station: unknown number of TEL; Weapons: MICA VL; Up to 6 × fire unit planned to be ordered. First delivery planned in 2026 / 2027.
NASAMS (Kongsberg Defence & Aerospace )		Norway; United States	Short to medium range SAM	NASAMS 3	4	Orders of fire units: 1 × fire unit in November 2025 (€500 million), including weapons (undisclosed number) Fire unit consists of: Sensors: Radar: 1 × AN/MPQ-64F1 Sentinel; Passive sensor: 1 × Rheinmetall MSP500 / MSP600; Fire control station: 1 × Kongsberg Fire Distribution Center; Launchers: 3 × Kongsberg Multi-Missile Launcher; Weapons: AIM-120 AMRAAM ER; AIM-9X Block II; Up to 4 × fire unit planned to be ordered.

==== Air surveillance ====
Aircraft	Image	Origin	Type	Variant	On order	Notes
Mobile radars
AN/TPY-4	–	United States	L-band (IEEE), AESA, GaN, 3D, early warning radar	–	3	Ranges: Intrustmented (in rotation): 555 km (300 nmi); Extended stare range: 1,000 km (540 nmi)
Thales GM200 MM/C		Netherlands	S-band (IEEE), AESA, GaN, 4D, air surveillance radar	–	5	Radar capable of: air surveillance; air defence; counter-battery Ranges: Air surveillance: 400 km (220 nmi); Intrustmented: 100 km (54 nmi)

== Ranks ==
=== Commissioned officer ranks ===
The rank insignia of commissioned officers.

NATO code	OF-10	OF-9	OF-8	OF-7	OF-6	OF-5	OF-4	OF-3	OF-2	OF-1
Royal Danish Air Force
Royal Danish Air Force		General	Generalløjtnant	Generalmajor	Brigadegeneral	Oberst	Oberstløjtnant	Major	Kaptajn	Premierløjtnant	Løjtnant	Sekondløjtnant
Danish Pay Grade		M406	M405	M404	M403	M402	M401	M332 M331 M322	M321	M312	M311	M310

=== Other ranks ===
The rank insignia of non-commissioned officers and enlisted personnel.

NATO code	OR-9	OR-8	OR-7	OR-6	OR-5		OR-4	OR-3	OR-2	OR-1
Royal Danish Air Force
Royal Danish Air Force	Chefsergent	Seniorsergent	Oversergent		Sergent	Sergent (Officerselev)	Korporal	Flyverspecialist	Flyveroverkonstabel	Flyverkonstabel
Danish Pay Grade	M232	M231	M221		M212	M211	M113	M112

== See also ==
- List of military aircraft of Denmark
- Danish Defence
- List of Lockheed F-104 Starfighter operators
- Military of Greenland
- NATO
- Royal Danish Army
- Royal Danish Navy
- Scandinavian defence union

== Bibliography ==
- Bruce, J. M. (April–July 1980). "Vickers' First Fighters". Air Enthusiast. No. 12. pp. 54–70. ISSN 0143-5450.
- Butler, Phil; Buttler, Tony (2006). Gloster Meteor: Britain's Celebrated First-Generation Jet. Hersham, Surrey, UK: Midland Publishing. ISBN 1-85780-230-6. OCLC 80331229. OL 9001279M.
- Crawford, Alex (2005). Wallsgrove, Roger (ed.). Bristol Bulldog, Gloster Gauntlet. Redbourn, UK: Mushroom Model Publications. ISBN 83-89450-04-6. LCCN 2015430286. OCLC 214301808. OL 9111179M.
- de Jong, Peter (2005). Le Fokker D.21 [The Fokker D.21]. Collection Profils Avions No. 9 (in French). Outreau, France: Éditions Lela Presse. ISBN 2-914017-26-X. OCLC 469656956.
- Green, William; Swanborough, Gordon (1976). "Annals of the Gauntlet". Air Enthusiast. No. 2. pp. 163–176. ISSN 0143-5450.
- Hall, Alan W. (1997). Hawker Hunter. Warpaint Series No. 8. Husborne Crawley, Bedfordshire, UK: Hall Park Books Ltd. ISSN 1363-0369. OCLC 65202521. OL 61686092M.
- Hansen, Ole Steen (2003). Danskernes Fly [The Planes of the Danes] (in Danish). ISBN 87-11-16282-1. OCLC 464311332. OL 61685828M.
- Kofoed, Hans (1962). Danske militærfly gennem 50 år, 1912-62 [Danish military aircraft through 50 years, 1912-62] (in Danish). København: Flyv's Forlag. OCLC 44078946.
- Owers, Colin (Spring 1994). "Fokker's Fifth: The C.V Multi-role Biplane". Air Enthusiast. No. 53. pp. 60–68. ISSN 0143-5450.
- Schrøder, Hans A. (1992). Det danske flyvevåben [Royal Danish Air Force] (in Danish). Danish War Museum. ISBN 87-89022-24-6. LCCN 94102058. OCLC 467010924. OL 1135200M.
- Schrøder, Hans A. (1990). Historien om Flyvevåbnet [The History of the Royal Danish Air Force] (in Danish). The committee for the publication of "The History of Royal Danish Air Force". ISBN 87-503-8509-7. OCLC 30132609. OL 7858858M.
