= Laanshøj =

- Town
- Location within Denmark
- Coordinates: 55°46′32″N 12°19′30″E
- Country: Denmark
- Region: Capital Region
- Municipality: Furesø Municipality

Population (2026)
  - Total: 972
- Time zone: UTC+1 (CET)
  - Summer (DST): UTC+2 (CEST)
- Website: www.laanshoj.net

Laanshøj is a small town located in the Furesø Municipality, in the Capital Region of Denmark.

Laanshøj is a new town located at the now closed Værløse Air Base.
