= Roskilde Barracks =

Coordinates: 55°38′19″N 12°04′19″E

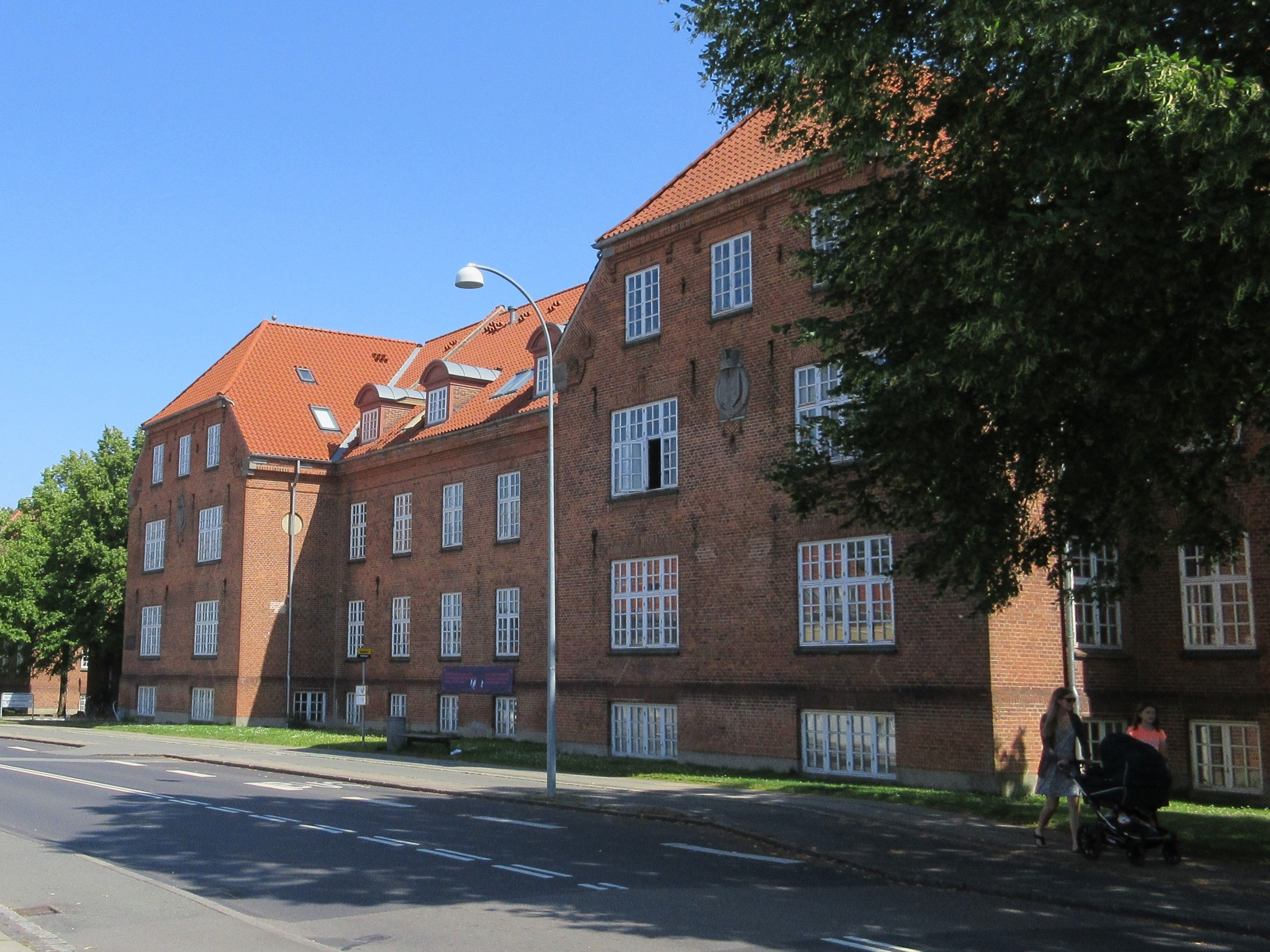
Helligkorsvej 5

Roskilde Barracks (Danish: Roskilde Kaserne), now known as Kildegården, is a former military barracks on Helligkorsvej in Roskilde, Denmark. The buildings are now owned by Roskilde Municipality and used as a hub for local sports clubs and other public associations and societies.

== History ==
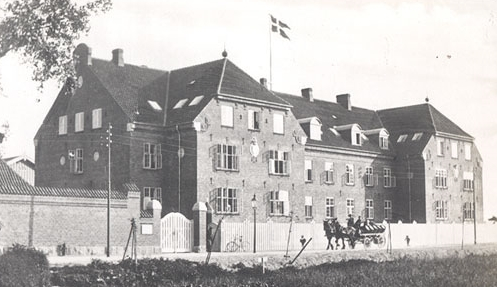
Roskilde Barracks, postcard photograph from 1913

Roskilde's first spell as a garrison town began in 1777 when a squadron of the Guard Hussar Regiments was stationed in the city. The soldiers stayed in rented premises at different locations around the city. Their commanding officer from 1806 until 1828 was Major Carl Christian Leopold von Gether. He was given a residence at Roskilde Royal Mansion. The Guard Hussars' horses were stabled in a 51-bay long, half-timbered building next to Roskilde Royal Mansion (Stændertorvet 3F) which is now known as the Hussar Stable (Husarstalden). The Guard Hussar s left Roskilde in 1842 in connection with a reorganization of the army.

The Danish Army Act of 1909 (Hærloven af 1909) placed a new garrison in Roskilde. Roskilde Barracks was originally built in 1911–12 but rebuilt after a fire in 1913. The architect was Vilhelm Fischer. The buildings were partly a gift from Roskilde to the Ministry of Defence and housed a battalion of 500 men.

The barracks was decommissioned in 1974. Most of the buildings were acquired by Roskilde Municipality while Infirmary and Commander's House were used as a new home for Roskilde city court. These buildings were purchased by the city in 2014 following the inauguration of the new Roskilde Courthouse.

== Today ==
The Barracks Building (Helligkorsvej 5) has the local television and radio channel Kanal Roskilde and Roskilde Handball Club among its tenants.

Helligkorsvej 3 and 3C is the old infirmary. Helligkorsvej 7 contained the commander's residence. The old gymnastics house is used by nearby Absalon's School (Absalonskolen), a primary school. The former garage complex is used for Roskilde Library's vehicles. Other buildings at the site include former stables and a small jailhouse.

The local department of DGI (Danske Gymnastik- & Idrætsforeninger) which covers central and western Zealand are planning to move their headquarters to Kildegården after first temporarily moving to Musicon.
