= Aalborg Air Base =

Military airbase for the Royal Danish Air Force

Aalborg Air Base
- Flyvestation Aalborg
- Aalborg in Denmark
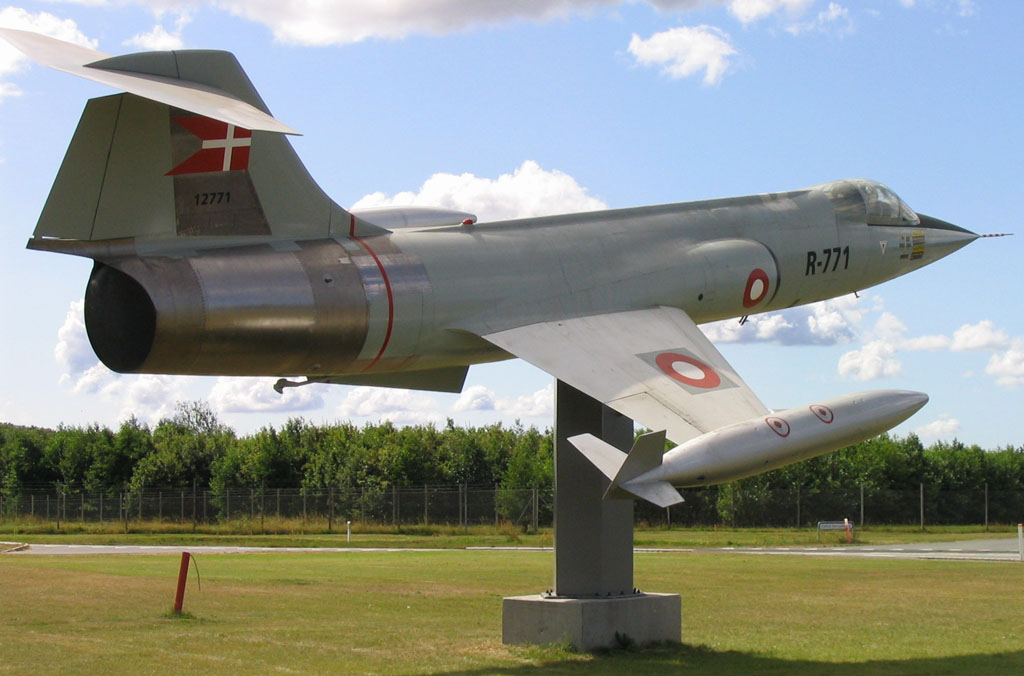
- F-104 Starfighter at the entrance to Aalborg Air Base.

Site information
- Type: Joint civil and military
- Owner: Ministry of Defence
- Operator: Royal Danish Air Force

Location
- Location in Denmark
- Coordinates: 57°05′34.04″N 09°50′56.99″E

Airfield information
- Identifiers: IATA: AAL, ICAO: EKYT
- Elevation: 3 metres (10 ft) AMSL
Runways
Direction	Length and surface
08R/26L	2,549 metres (8,363 ft) Asphalt
08L/26R	2,654 metres (8,707 ft) Asphalt

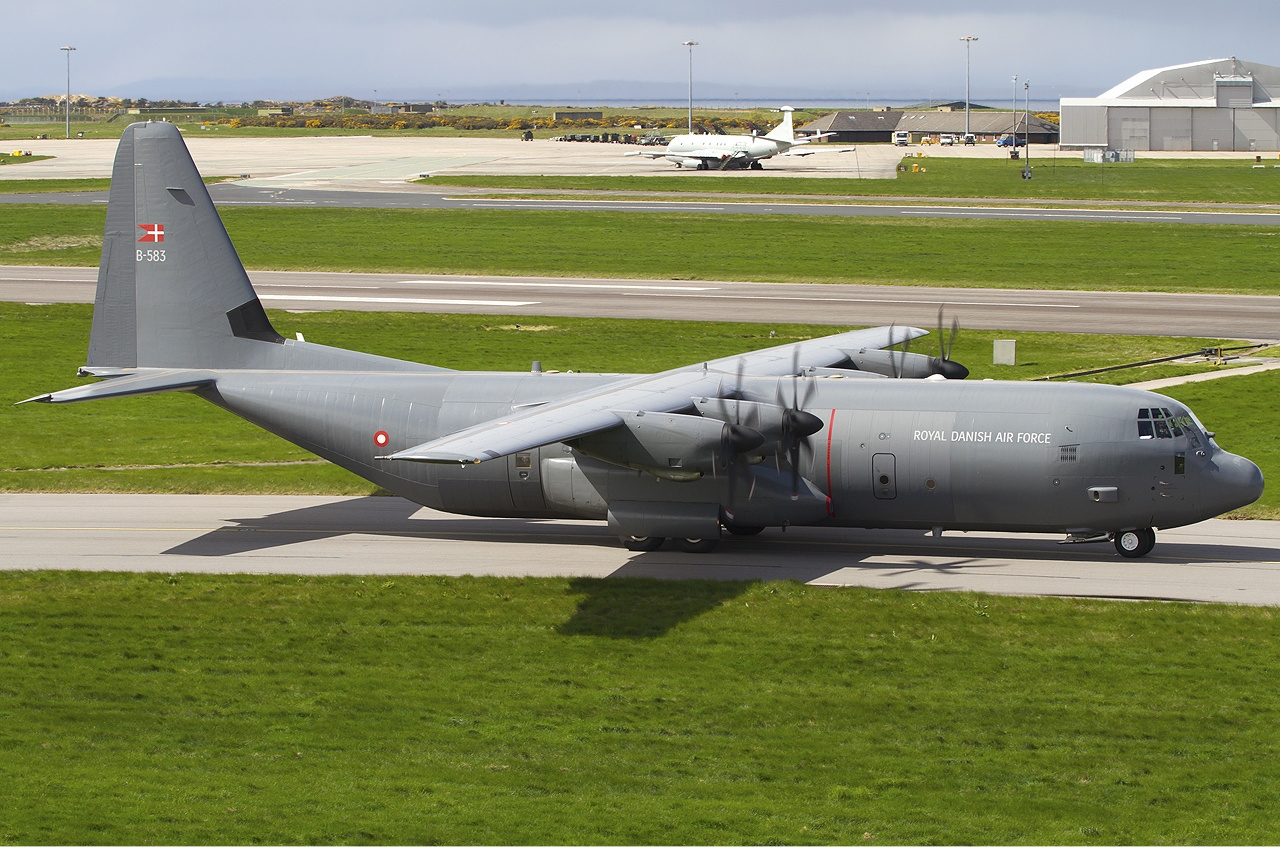
C130 Hercules transport aircraft based in Aalborg

Aalborg Air Base (Danish: Flyvestation Aalborg) also Air Transport Wing Aalborg is a military air base for the Royal Danish Air Force (IATA: AAL, ICAO: EKYT). It is located at Vadum, near Aalborg, Denmark. Aalborg Air Base shares its runway system as well as some services, including air traffic control, with Aalborg Airport.

== History ==
Aalborg Air Base was established along with Aalborg Airport in 1938, serving the first Danish domestic flight between Aalborg and Copenhagen. The air base was established following pressure from the Aalborg Portland cement factory as local authorities were hesitant to invest in air traffic infrastructure.

When Germany invaded Denmark on 9 April 1940, the German Luftwaffe launched one of the first airborne operations in history, in which paratroopers captured the airport. Aalborg Airport was considered a crucial element in the ferrying of troops and equipment from Germany to Norway as it acted as a refuelling base for Luftwaffe transport planes, especially Junkers Ju 52/3m, during the campaign. The Luftwaffe greatly expanded the airport - which they called Fliegerhorst Aalborg West - from 140 to 2750 hectares of land.

A well-known air battle took place over the airport on 13 August 1940, when a squadron of Royal Air Force Bristol Blenheim bombers attacked the German aircraft based there. All eleven attacking aircraft were shot down by either German anti-aircraft fire or Messerschmitt Bf 109 fighter aircraft.

On June 16, 1944, Royal Air Force de Havilland Mosquitoes attacked the airfield. One of the RAF pilots, New Zealand fighter ace Michael Herrick, was killed leading aircraft of No. 305 Polish Bomber Squadron. His earlier service had included flying night fighters in the Battle of Britain and two operational tours flying Curtiss P-40 Kittyhawks in the Pacific before returning to Britain to fly Mosquitoes against the Luftwaffe.

After the war, an internment camp for Baltic German refugees was set up at the location. When the Royal Air Force arrived at the airport in 1945 most military and airport equipment had been destroyed. At this time the airport is by far the largest in Denmark. When the Royal Danish Air Force was created in 1950, it took over the Fliegerhorst.

== Based units ==
Aalborg is the base for Denmark's elite Jaeger Corps special forces unit as well as the Royal Danish Air Force's 721 Squadron. The 721 Squadron is an air transport squadron equipped with four Lockheed C-130J-30 Hercules and four CL-604 Challenger aircraft.

Until their decommissioning on 10 January 2006, Aalborg Air Base was also home to the 723 Squadron and 726 Squadron. These two squadrons were reconnaissance and fighter squadrons equipped with Lockheed F-16MLU Fighting Falcon aircraft. The aircraft from these squadrons were transferred to Skrydstrup Air Base after their dissolution.

== See also ==
- List of the largest airports in the Nordic countries
