= Eskadrille 721 =

Squadron 721
- Eskadrille 721
- Founded: 1 October 1950; 74 years ago
- Country: Denmark
- Branch: Royal Danish Air Force
- Type: Air Transport
- Part of: Air Transport Wing Aalborg
- Garrison/HQ: Flyvestation Aalborg
- Motto(s): Fortis, Firmus Undique (Strong, Reliable, Everywhere)

Aircraft flown
- Trainer: Saab T-17 Supporter
- Transport: Lockheed C-130J Super Hercules; Bombardier CL-604 Challenger

Eskadrille 721 of the Royal Danish Air Force is the sole squadron in 'Air Transport Wing Aalborg' of the Danish Defence. It provides tactical transport for all parts of the Danish state.

== History ==
Eskadrille 721 (721 Squadron) was formed on 1 October 1950, when the Royal Danish Air Force (Flyvevåbnet) was formed by merging the Marinens Flyvevæsen (Danish Naval Air Service) and Hærens Flyvertropper (Danish Army Air Corps), with Eskadrille 721 incorporating the aircraft of the 1st and 2nd Luftflotille of the Naval Air Service, together with the Greenland flight of the Army Air Corps, with the role of transport (including support for operations in Greenland, together with Search and Rescue operations.

== Present activity ==
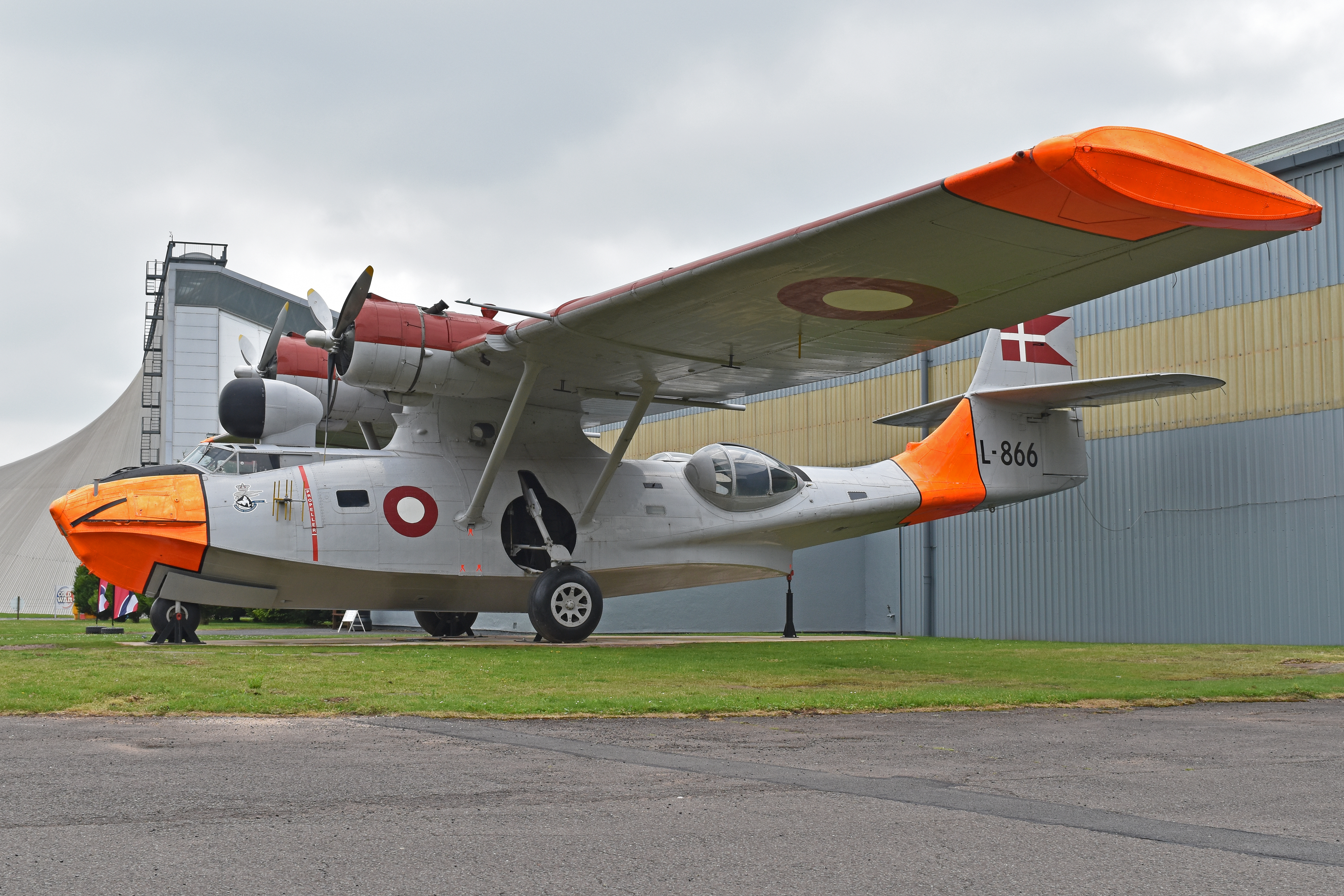
Squadron Catalina visible at Royal Air Force Museum Midlands, Cosford

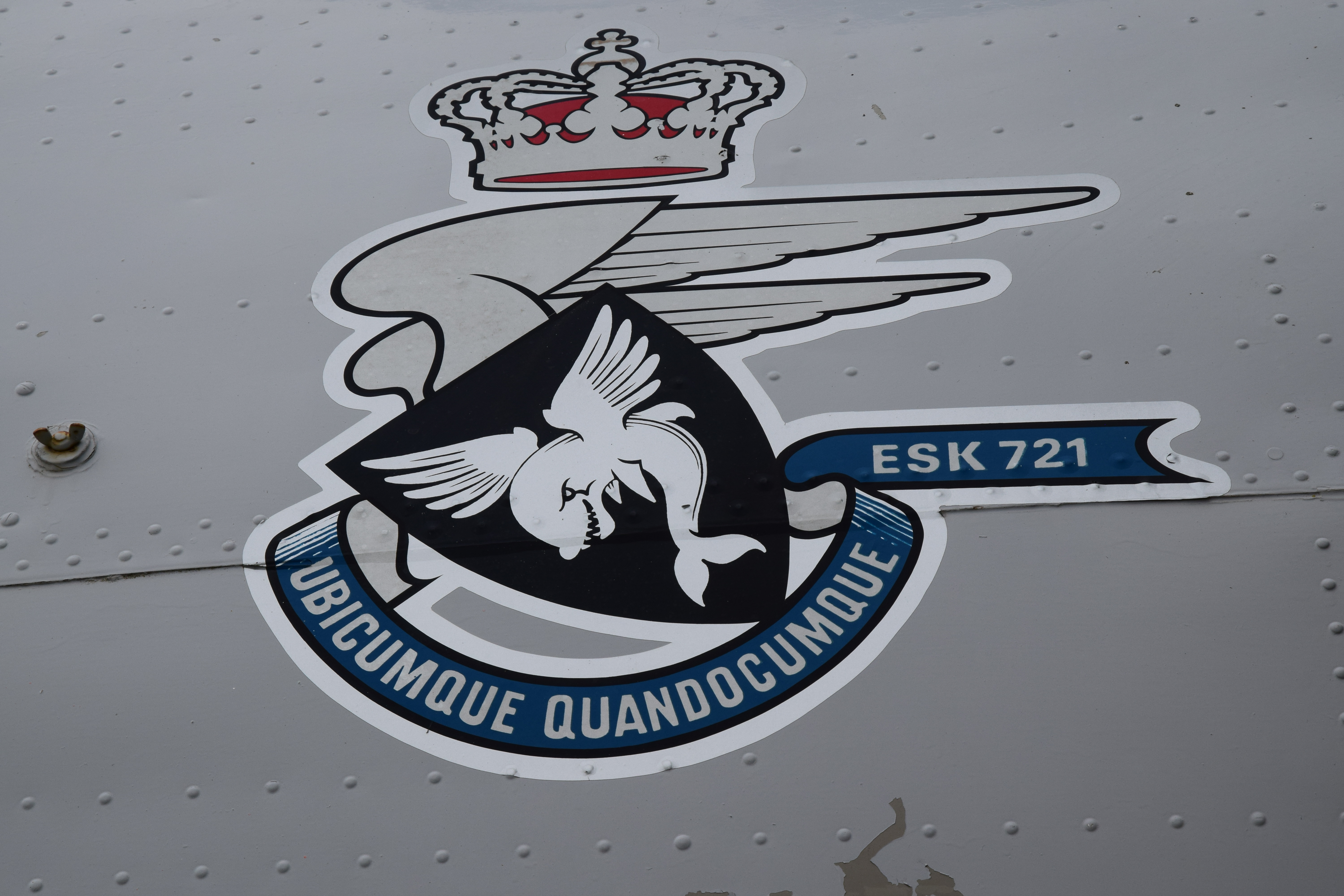
"Zap" of squadron emblem visible on RAF aircraft at the Royal Air Force Museum Midlands, RAF Cosford.

Since 2004 the air wing is located at Flyvestation Aalborg, in the Northern part of Jutland peninsula.

The main role for the air wing is to provide tactical transport capacity with its C-130's. The Challengers provide both VIP-transportation for the Royal Court of Denmark and other government officials, and has the option to be equipped with airborne radar for surveillance. The Challenger 604 is tasked with assisting in surveillance missions around Greenland and the Faroe Islands and in that capacity one aircraft has been permanently stationed in Kangerlussuaq, Greenland since 2021.

== Current equipment ==
Currently Eskadrille 721 operates:

- 4 Lockheed C-130J Super Hercules
- 4 Bombardier CL-604 Challenger
- 4 Saab T-17 Supporter

== See also ==
- Danish Defence
