= Fighter Wing Skrydstrup =

Air base of the Royal Danish Air Force

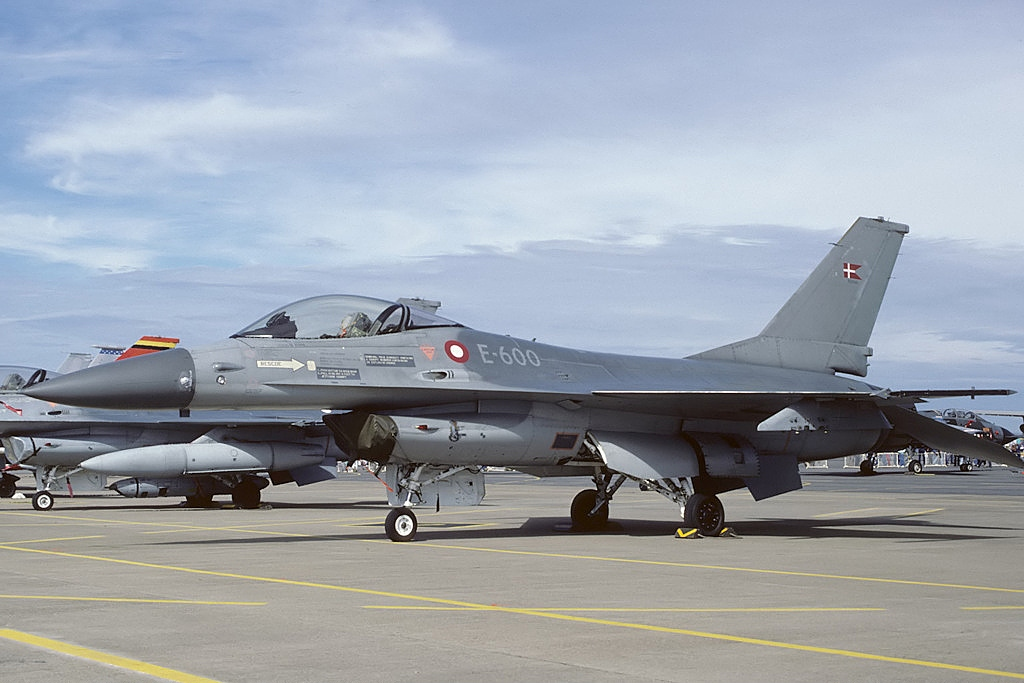
RDAF F-16 aircraft, now retired

Fighter Wing Skrydstrup is an air base of the Royal Danish Air Force (RDAF) situated in southern Jutland. It is home to the F-35 Lightning II fighters of the RDAF along with a Saab T-17 Supporter, and a single search and rescue helicopter covering southern Denmark.

A total of 1000 people work at the fighter wing serving in the three groups Wing Staff, Operations Group and Maintenance Group. The air base covers an area of 838 hectares with three runways with a length of 3,500 meters.

On 18 January 2026, the Royal Danish Air Force officially retired the F-16, marking the end of Denmark's F-16 operations at Skrydstrup Air Base. The withdrawal coincided with Denmark's full transition to the F-35A fighters.

== History ==
The air base was constructed by the Luftwaffe during the German occupation of Denmark as Fliegerhorst Hadersleben in 1943 as part of the Atlantic Wall. The air base was designed to base 24 Heinkel He 177 bombers and a squadron of Messerschmitt Bf 109 or Focke-Wulf 190 fighters, along with a series of training and reconnaissance aircraft. Due to shortages in material and later alterations of the atlantic defence, the intended flights were never based at Skrydstrup. Instead, various smaller units of minesweepers, transport planes and training units used the air base in the last years of the occupation.

After the war the air base was used as a camp for German refugees. In 1953 the Royal Danish Air Force decided to expand the runways to 3000 meters making it possible to base jet aircraft in Skrydstrup.

=== Squadron 727 ===
Based i Skrydstrup

=== Squadron 730 ===
In 1954, squadron 730 was established by the Danish Ministry of Defence and based at Skrydstrup. The squadron consisted of F-84G Thunderjets facing ten crashes until their replacement in 1961 by F-100 Super Sabre, forming the core of the squadron for more than 20 years.

In the mid-1970s the Super Sabres caused a series of crashes leading to a total grounding of the squadron for more than four months. Mechanical investigations revealed engine failures which were fixed and improved by 1977. But at this time preparations were being made to replace the Super Sabres with the new General Dynamics F-16 Fighting Falcon, which arrived at Skrydstrup in January 1980.

=== Deployment abroad ===
The introduction of the F-16 changed the physical setup at the air base as it was fit only for air defence, air policing, and air-to-surface attacks. The capability to perform long-range attacks and deploy aircraft around the world dominated the new setup instead of the traditional defensive structure. As a result, the first Danish military aircraft were deployed to the Red Flag exercise in Nevada in 1984. Since then, the squadron has been deployed in a series of military conflicts including Operation Allied Force in 1999, Operation Enduring Freedom in 2002, Operation Unified Protector in Libya in 2011 and seven F-16AM based at Ahmad al-Jaber Air Base in Kuwait to fight the Islamic State forces (ISIS / ISIL) in October 2014.
