= Vojens Airport =

Vojens Airport Vojens Lufthavn
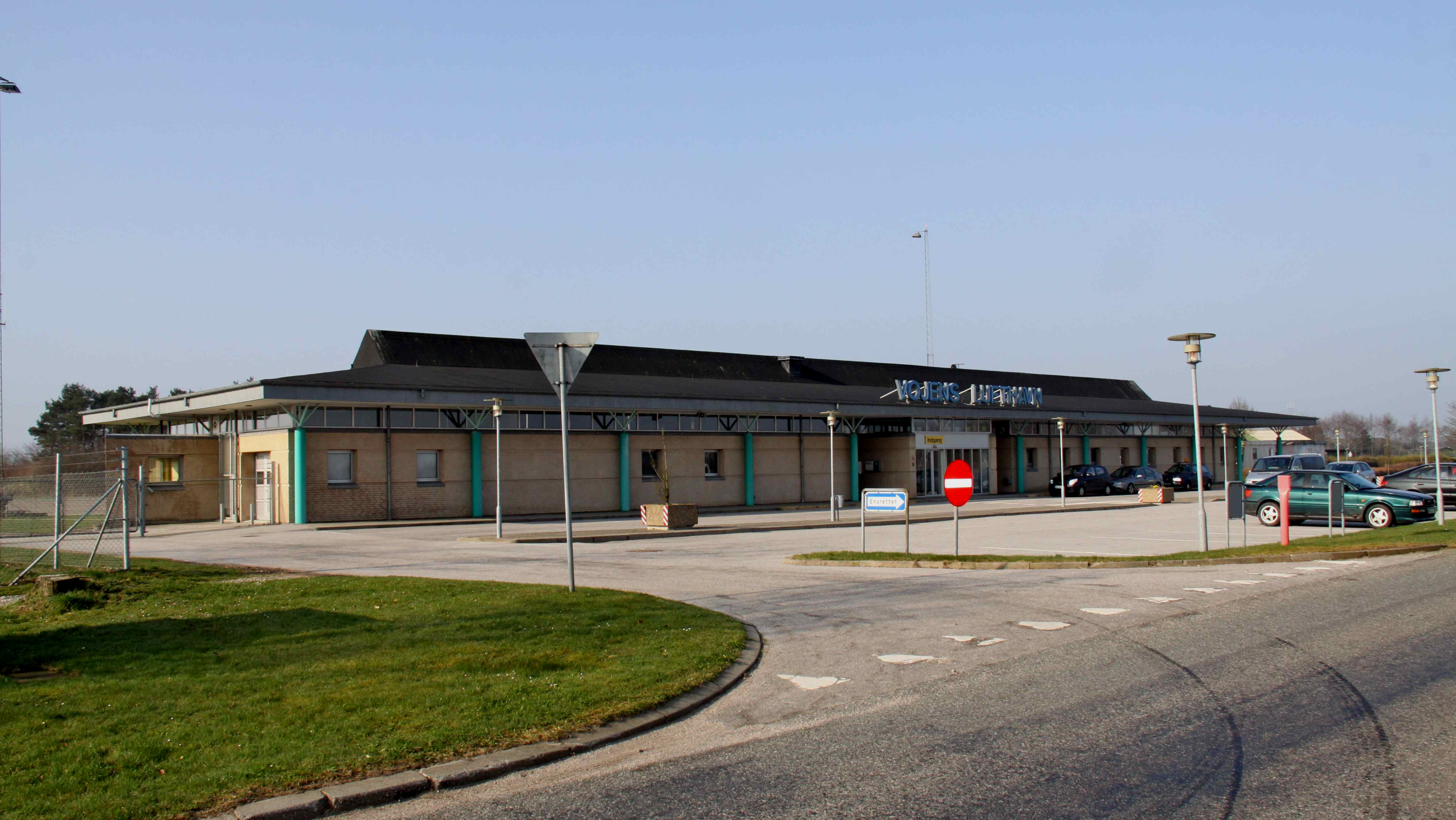
- IATA: SKS; ICAO: EKSP

Summary
- Location: Vojens, Denmark
- Elevation AMSL: 141 ft (43 m)
- Coordinates: 55°13′16″N 009°16′00″E
- Interactive map of Vojens Airport

Runways
Direction	Length		Surface
Direction	ft	m	Surface
10R/28L	9,862	3,006	Asphalt/concrete
10L/28R	9,747	2,971	Asphalt/concrete

Vojens Airport, also known as Skrydstrup Airport, is an airport in Vojens, Denmark. It shares runways with Fighter Wing Skrydstrup.
