= Air Base Karup =

Main air base of the Royal Danish Air Force

Air Base Karup
- Midtjyllands Airport, 3 kilometres west of Karup
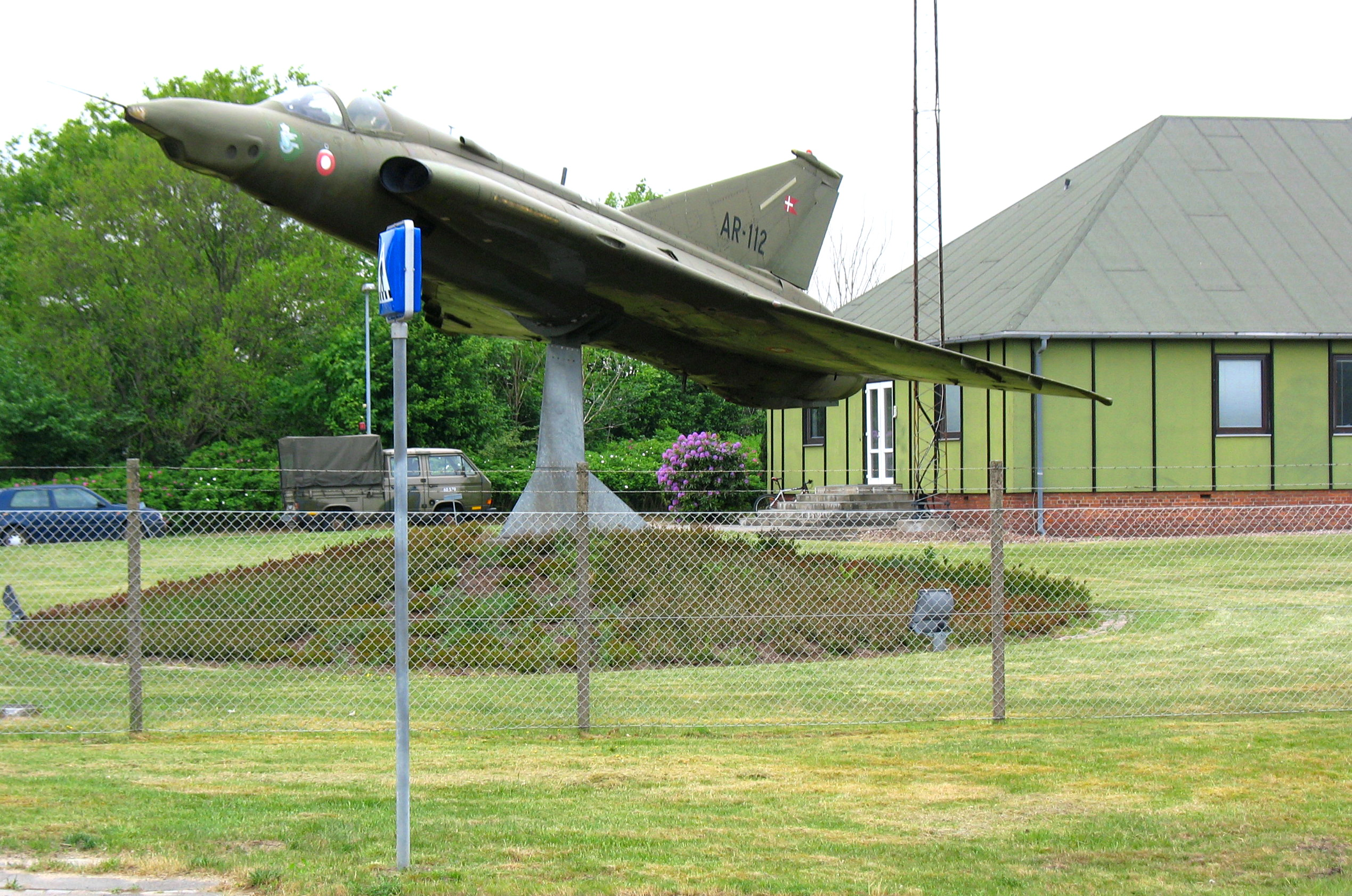
- Saab F-35 Draken on display at the entrance to Karup Air Base.

Site information
- Owner: Ministry of Defence
- Operator: Royal Danish Air Force

Location
- Location in Denmark
- Coordinates: 56.2795°N 9.1203°E

Site history
- Built: 1940; 86 years ago

Airfield information
- Identifiers: ICAO: EKKA

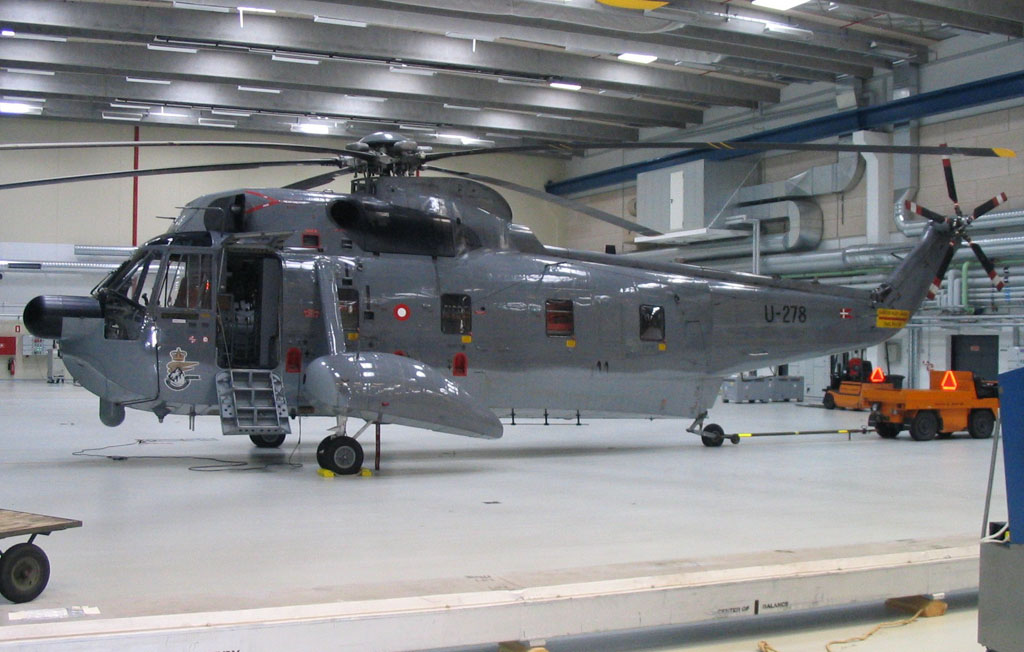
Sikorsky S-61 formerly at Karup Air Base, before being phased out of the RDAF completely

Air Base Karup (ICAO: EKKA) is the main air base of the Royal Danish Air Force. It is situated 3 km west of Karup in mid-Jutland.

The air base covers 3000 hectares of land of which only a third is inside the operational area marked by a 17 km long fence. Midtjyllands Airport shares its runways.

== History ==
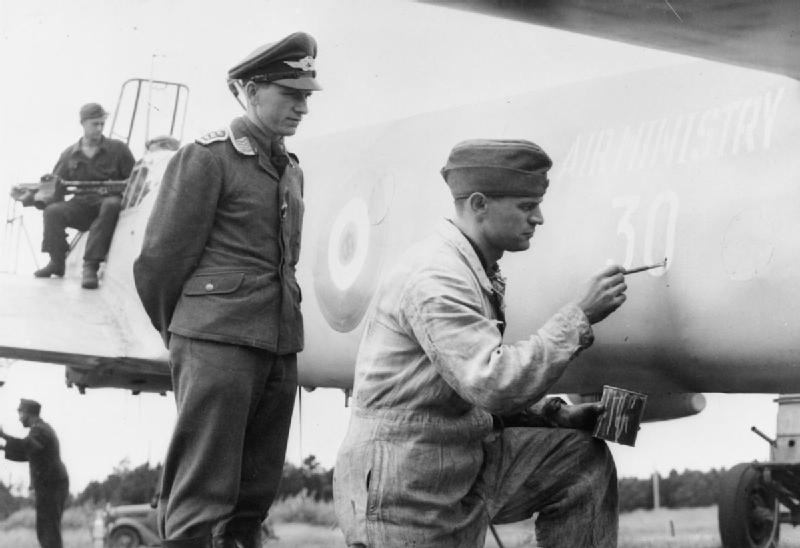
German POWs paint British markings on a Messerschmitt Bf 110 night fighter following the liberation of Denmark in August 1945

The air base was constructed by the Luftwaffe during the German Occupation in 1940 under the name "Einsatzhafen Grove" (later Flieger-Horst Grove) to facilitate offensive operations against England. Later in the war, it became a base for defensive fighter planes.

Following the British advance into Denmark in May 1945, during which the airfield was surrendered to Captain Eric Brown RN of the Royal Aircraft Establishment (RAE), a group of nine Arado Ar 234B reconnaissance bombers were found at the base and subsequently transferred by Brown and his colleagues to Farnborough. By December 1945 the air base was taken over by the Danish Civil Air Defence, which used it as a refugee camp for 22,000 German refugees.

Control over the area was transferred to the Royal Danish Army in January 1946, continuing the use as refugee camp until 1949. In 1947 the Danish Army Air Corps established a flying school, maintenance centre and logistics office at Karup, preparing for Gloster Meteor, Airspeed Oxford and Supermarine Spitfire military aircraft. When the Royal Danish Air Force (RDAF) was established in 1950, the area was named Air Base Karup.

During the post-war years, Karup Air Base became a central part of Denmark's NATO defence plan and played a major role in the establishment of the RDAF. In 1955 the Tactical Air Command was placed at Karup.

Several American produced planes were stationed at the base in the 1950s and 1960s, among them the Lockheed T-33 Shooting Star, Republic F-84 Thunderjet, RF-84F and F-100 Super Sabre. In 1970 the RDAF purchased two squadrons of Swedish Saab 35 Draken strike fighters and stationed them at Karup.

During the 1980s and 1990s several smaller units in the Royal Danish Air Force moved from Værløse Air Base near Copenhagen and Vandel Air Base in southern Jutland to Karup Air Base. In 1993 the Army Operational Command was placed at the air base.

== Wings and units ==
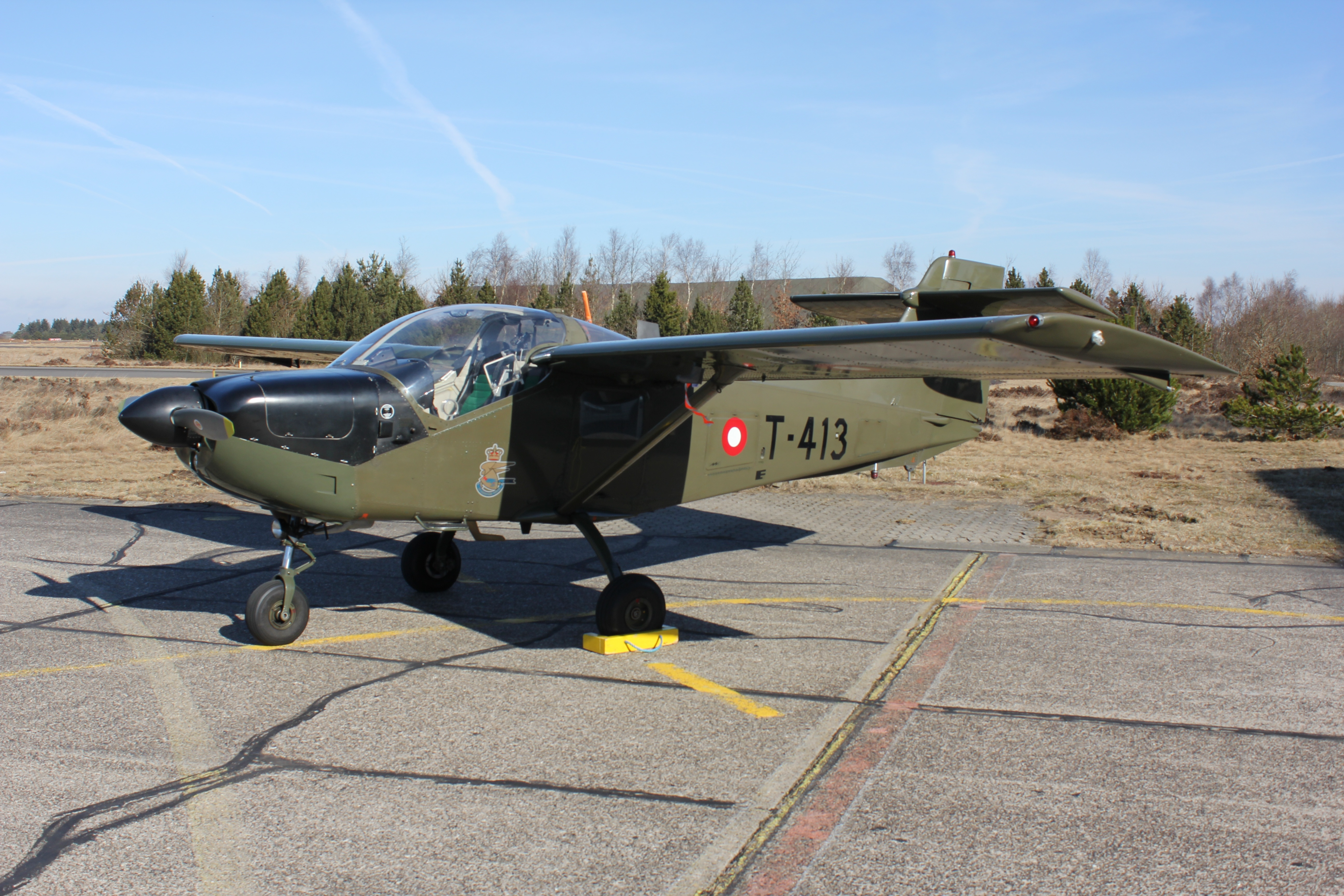
Saab T-17 Supporter at Karup Air Base

The air base is home to the following units under the Royal Danish Air Force:

- Helicopter Wing Karup
- RDAF Flying School
- RDAF Air Control Wing
- RDAF Specialist School
- RDAF Training Centre
- Expeditionary Air Staff
- Operation Support Wing

Further, the operational commands of the Royal Danish Army and the RDAF is situated at the base.

== Civilian companies ==
The arms and technology company Danish Aerotech has its facilities in the air base area. It produces and maintains aeroplanes and missiles.
