= Quick Reaction Alert =

Readiness policy by NATO air forces

Quick Reaction Alert (QRA) is the state of readiness and modus operandi of air defence maintained at all hours of the day by NATO air forces. The United States usually refers to Quick Reaction Alert as Airspace Control Alert.

Some non-NATO countries maintain a QRA, either full-time or part-time.

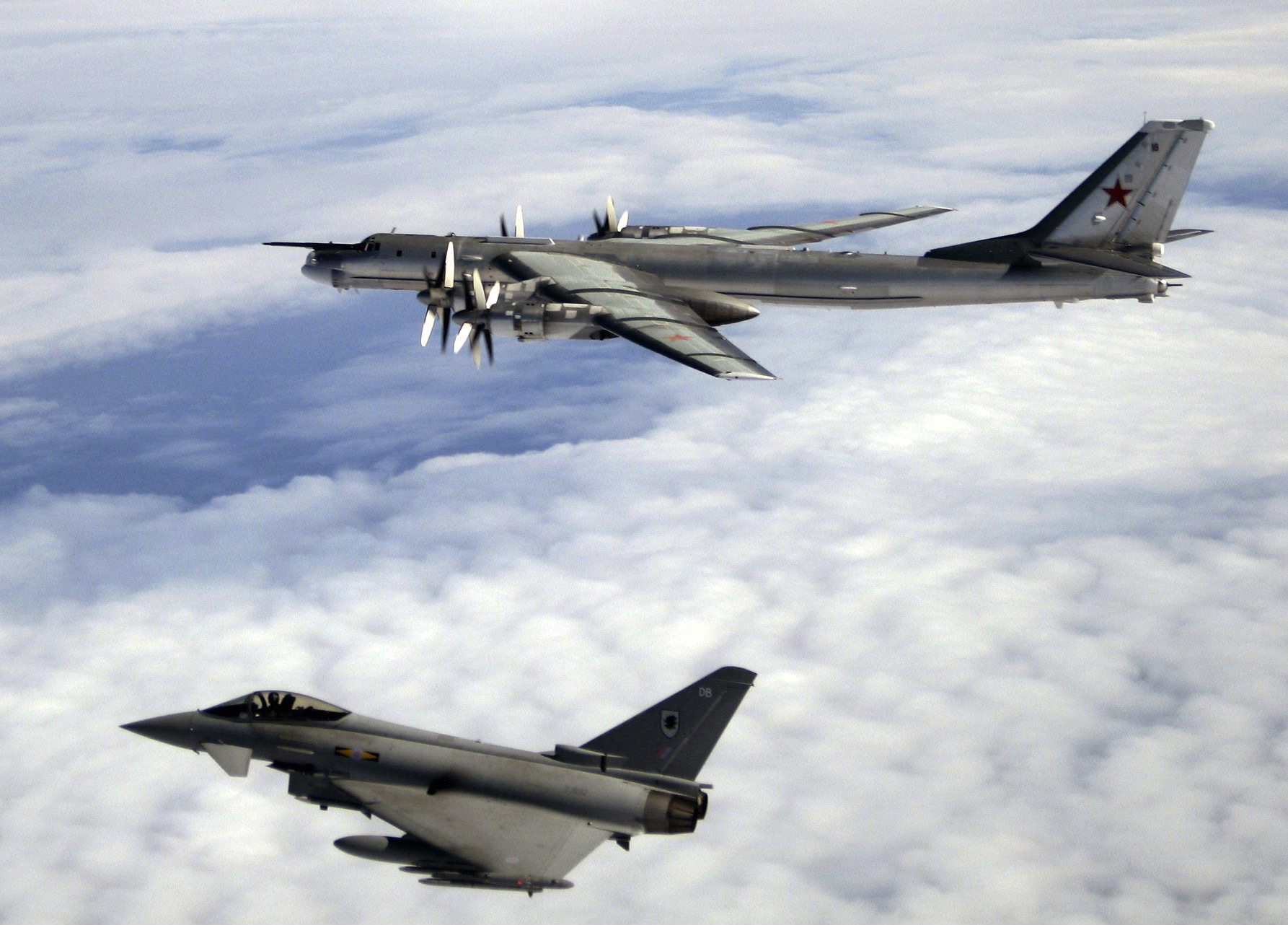
A QRA Typhoon from XI Sqn at RAF Coningsby escorts a Russian Tu-95 (ASCC designation "Bear") in August 2008

== Operation ==
=== QRA in the United Kingdom ===
There are two QRA stations in the United Kingdom, one at RAF Coningsby in the east of England, and the other at RAF Lossiemouth in Scotland.

Pilots and engineers on QRA duty are at immediate readiness twenty-four hours a day. They are fully dressed in the Crew Ready Room, which are next to the hangars, a hardened aircraft shelter known informally as Q-sheds, which houses the interceptor aircraft, since 2007 the Eurofighter Typhoon. Pilots are on QRA duty around once or twice a month, each a twenty-four-hour shift.

Engineers are on QRA duty three or four times a year, each for a twenty-four-hour a day shift, for seven days at a time. Two Typhoon aircraft are maintained at readiness, along with a Voyager tanker at RAF Brize Norton in Oxfordshire. Before 2014 this task was carried out by a TriStar.

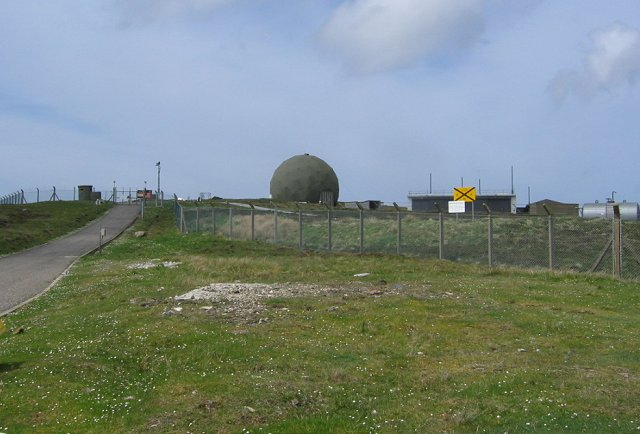
RRH Benbecula in June 2004

Civilian aircraft in the UK are monitored by NATS Holdings at:

- Swanwick, Hampshire with the London Area Control Centre and London Terminal Control Centre (at RAF West Drayton until 2007), broadly known as the London Air Traffic Control Centre, which covers the London Flight Information Region (EGTT). The RAF have a team at Swanwick.
- Prestwick, which covers the Scotland Flight Information Region (EGPX) which is north of the Solway Firth.

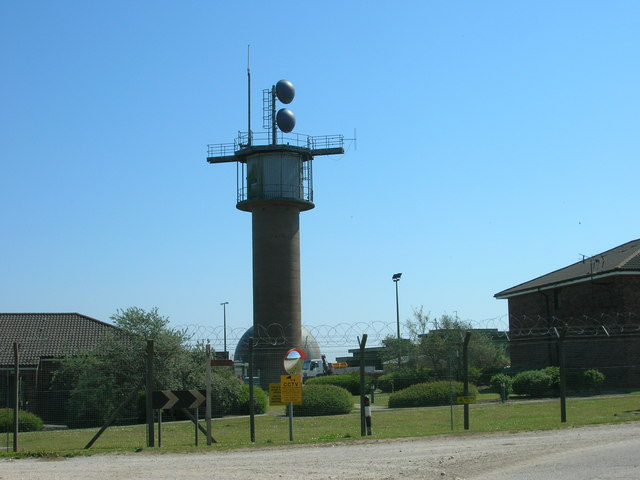
RRH Staxton Wold in May 2009. Staxton Wold is possibly the oldest operational radar station in the world

Military radar in the UK is controlled by the UK Air Surveillance and Control System (ASACS), looked after by ASACS Force Command. It has Remote Radar Heads (RRH) at:

- RRH Benbecula in the Outer Hebrides
- RRH Saxa Vord in Shetland (AN/TPS-77 radar moved from RRH Staxton Wold)
- RRH Buchan (former Master Radar Station, or MRS, Buchan) off the A90 south of Peterhead
- RRH Brizlee Wood in Hulne Park, Northumberland (west of RAF Boulmer)
- RRH Staxton Wold off the B1249 in Willerby, North Yorkshire
- RRH Neatishead at Neatishead, Norfolk
- RRH Portreath in Cornwall

From 1997, the radars were the 1.1MW Plessey AR-320 (Type 93) and were replaced by the Lockheed Martin AN/FPS-117 system.

=== QRA in the United States ===
The United States refers to Quick Reaction Alert as Airspace Control Alert.

== QRA response ==
A QRA response involves fighter aircraft being scrambled to investigate an infringement of a NATO country's airspace or area of interest. Air traffic across Europe is controlled by Eurocontrol in Brussels.

The command of each nation's QRA mission is handled by a NATO Combined Air Operations Centre (CAOC). As of 2026, the three CAOCs are located at:

- Torrejón (CAOC TJ) in Spain, which handles operations south of the Alps;
- Uedem (CAOC UE) in Germany, which handles operations north of the Alps;
- Bodø (CAOC ENBO) in Norway, which handles operations in the Nordic countries (Finland, Norway and Sweden).

The control of these missions is delegated to the respective nation's Control and Reporting Centre (CRC), which then responds directly to its assigned NATO CAOC. Thus, the aircraft on QRA duty are controlled by the national CRC, which in turn reports to and is commanded by the CAOC.

When an aircraft without a flight plan or lacking an active transponder and refusing to identify is detected by national or allied radar on the outer limit of an Air Policing Area (APA), (Note: An APA has similar dimensions to the Flight Information Region (FIR)) the information, called a Recognised Air Picture (RAP), is passed via Link 16 connection by the CRC to its CAOC. The CAOC then analyses the RAP and, after deciding which fighters will be sent, issues an order for an alpha scramble (with live ordnance). Two aircraft on QRA duty, forming an element or section (two-ship formation - leader and wingman), are then launched (depending on the situation, a second element could be launched as well).

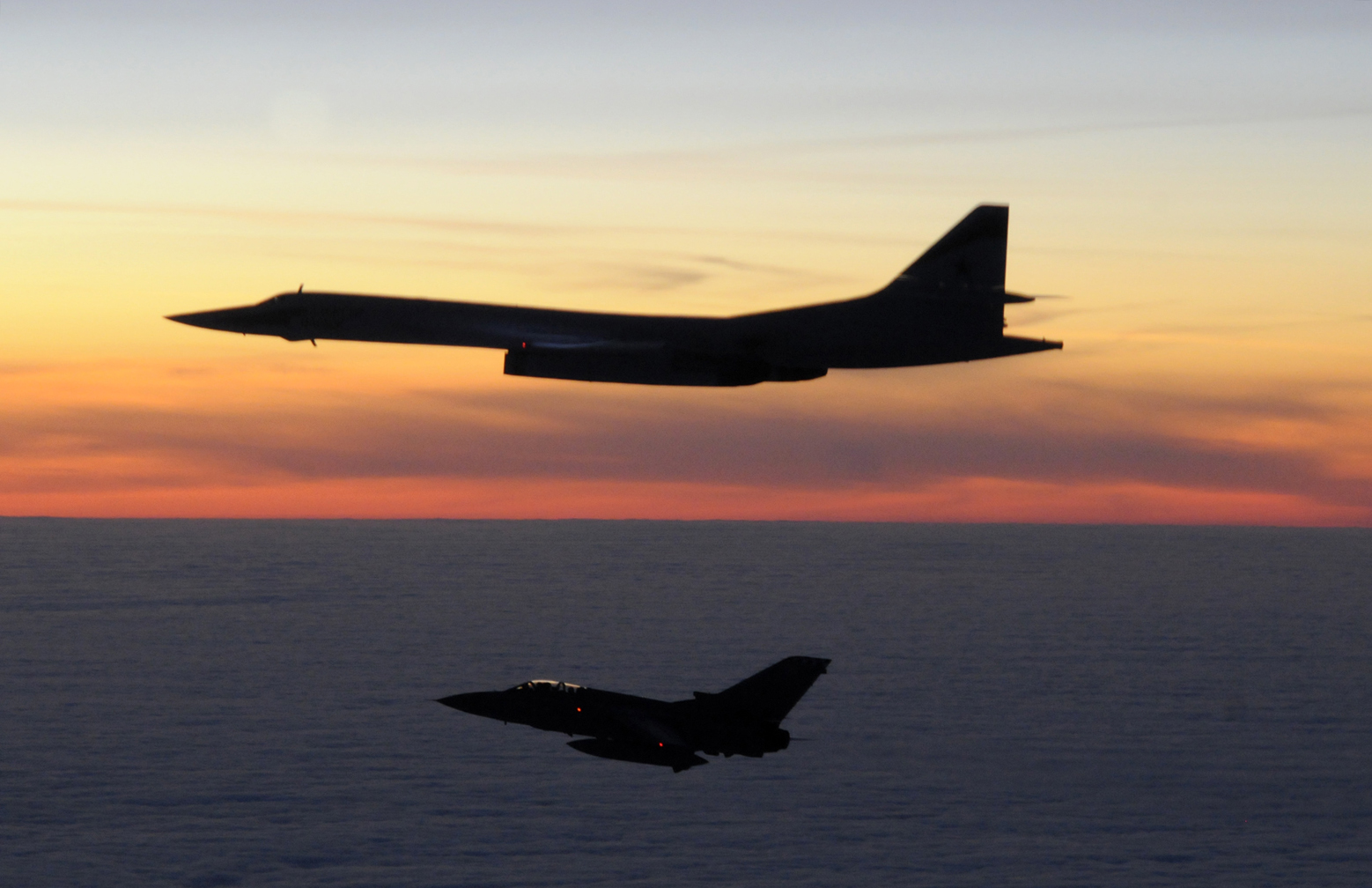
A QRA Tornado F3 of 111 Sqn escorting a Russian Tu-160 west of Stornoway

After taking off, the fighter element is directed by the national CRC. The primary mission is to "INTERCEPT" the target, designated as a BOGEY (an unidentified radar contact). As the pilots maintain continuous contact with the CRC (either by radio or through Link 16) and provide data on the target, they are ordered on how to proceed. The following tasks can be further issued:

- "INTERROGATE" - obtaining additional information about the target through any means (radio or visual contact);
- "VID" - visual identification, which is part of the "interrogate" process and involves acquiring more details about the target (aircraft type, markings, armament, etc.) either through direct visual contact or through onboard equipment;
- "SHADOW" - involves following the target and obtaining information about it, without being detected if possible;
- "ESCORT" - the fighters enter formation with the target aircraft and will either escort it until it leaves the area, or to a designated airfield for landing.

Based on the target's behaviour, the decision-makers might issue an order to engage and shoot it down, in accordance with the Rules of Engagement (ROE). The order "ENGAGE" is given as follows:

- if the bogey is military - in this case, the CAOC commander (COM CAOC) will issue the order. The intercepting aircraft will only engage the BANDIT (designated enemy aircraft) in self-defence;
- if the bogey is civilian - in this situation, if the aircraft is determined to have been hijacked, it is designated as RENEGADE and a RTOA (Reverse Transfer Of Command) will take place by which command is transferred from the CAOC to the national CRC and the order to engage is ultimately given by the CRC.

When the order to engage is given, in accordance with the ROE, the target is designated HOSTILE and the fighters are clear to engage. Within the element, the leader has the primary role in engaging while the wingman maintains formation and supports the leader.

Military aircraft from Russia could be tracked across Norway and reported to the Norwegian Joint Headquarters near Bodø, or the Combined Air Operations Centre 2 (CAOC UE) in Uedem, North Rhine-Westphalia, close to the border with the Netherlands. Combined Air Operations Centre Finderup (CAOC Finderup), in Denmark, watched Russian aircraft, could alert the UK, and had RAF staff there until its deactivation in June 2013. Since then, responsibility from Finderup was transferred to Uedem.

Russian Air Force Tupolev Tu-95 aircraft originate from the Olenya air base on the Kola Peninsula. Tupolev Tu-160 Blackjack aircraft come from the Engels-2 base near Saratov. The Tu-95 aircraft are on 12-14 hour missions, and when tracked across Norway, have been colloquially referred to with the codename of zombies.

=== QRA response in the United Kingdom ===
This may also be a civilian aircraft that poses a threat, if not sufficiently responding to air traffic control (ATC). Incidents of this nature in the UK are monitored by the CRC at RAF Boulmer, which builds a 3D Recognised Air Picture. The National Air and Space Operations Centre (NASOC) at RAF Air Command, RAF High Wycombe decides whether to send a QRA response. The Joint Force Air Component Headquarters is also at High Wycombe.

== QRA stations ==
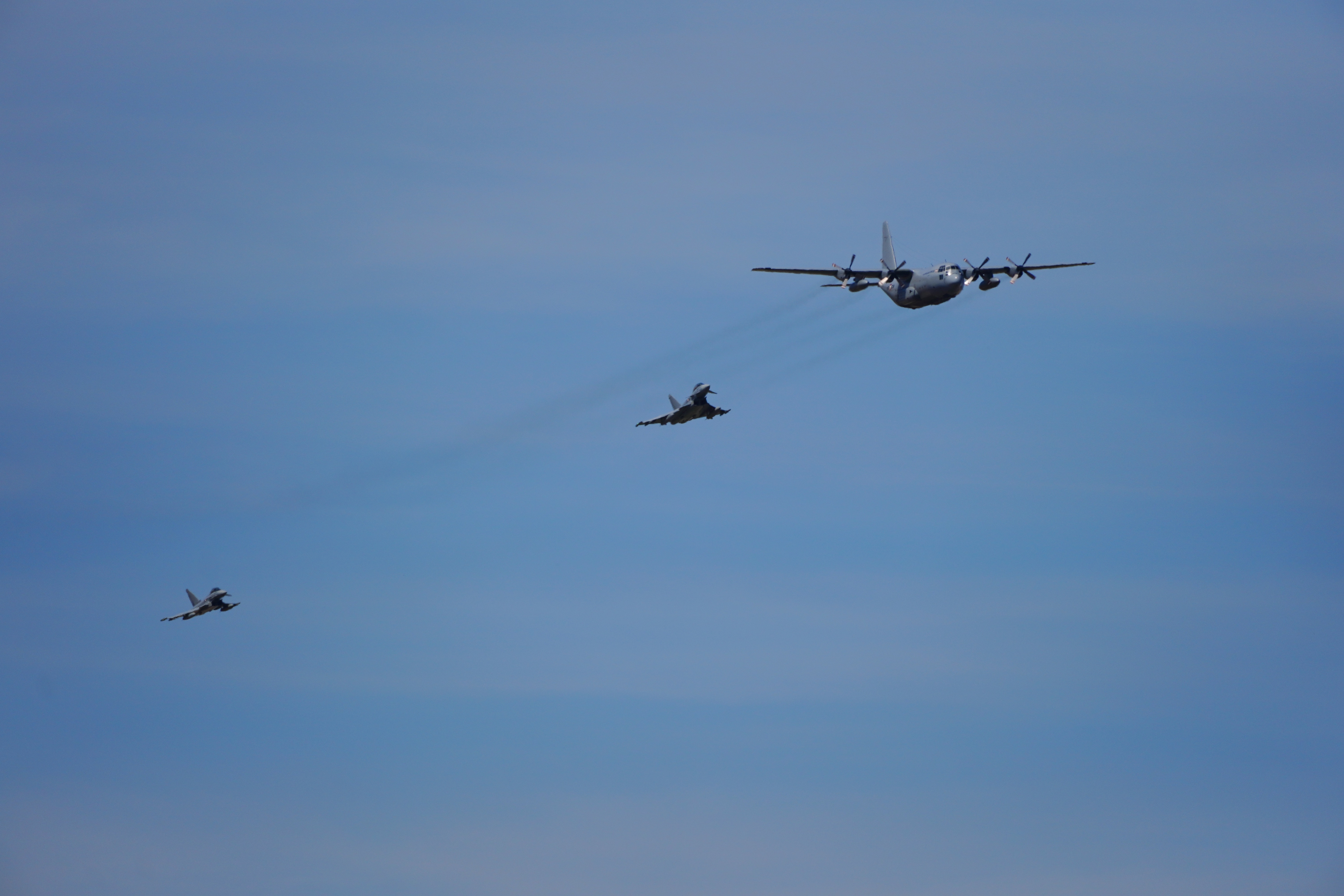
Austrian Air Force Eurofighter aircraft demonstrating QRA tactics at 2022 RIAT in Gloucestershire

=== Austria ===
Austria has only daylight QRA readiness. Austrian Air Force Air Surveillance Command is located at Salzburg. Fighter Squadron 1 & 2 with Eurofighter Typhoon are at Zeltweg Air Base.

=== Baltic States ===
Lithuania, Latvia and Estonia, though members of NATO, have no fighters capable of QRA intercepts. Other NATO nations provide periodic air defence at the NATO QRA standard as part of NATO Baltic Air Policing.

=== Belgium ===
Florennes Air Base and Kleine Brogel Air Base.

=== Bulgaria ===
Graf Ignatievo Air Base (3rd Fighter Air Base) of the BuAF has a single MiG-29 squadron, which carry two R-73 missiles. The Bulgarian CRC is at Sofia.

=== Croatia ===
The Croatian Air Force's Air Force and Air Defence Command is located in Zagreb. The 191. Fighter Squadron, flies Dassault Rafales from Pleso (Zagreb Airport).

=== Czech Republic ===
The 261st Control and Reporting Centre (CRC), is in Hlavenec. The Czech Air Force uses JAS-39C/D Gripen at Čáslav AFB.

=== Denmark ===
The Royal Danish Air Force Command is headquartered at Karup Air Base. The Fighter Wing with the Eskadrille 727 and the Eskadrille 730, at Skrydstrup Air Base use F-35A Lightning II fighters.

=== Finland ===
The Finnish Air Operations Centre is at Jyväskylä–Tikkakoski Air Base. The Finnish Air Force Fighter Squadron 31 (Hävittäjälentolaivue 31, HävLLv 31) uses F-18C/D from Rovaniemi and Kuopio. In addition to the Air Force's main operating bases, QRA aircraft may by rotated between civilian airports and other temporary operating bases.

=== Germany ===
The municipality of Uedem houses NATO's Combined Air Operations Centre (CAOC) Uedem.

Taktisches Luftwaffengeschwader 74 provides cover in the south, and Taktisches Luftwaffengeschwader 71 "Richthofen" in the north. The German Air Force uses Eurofighter Typhoons from Wittmund (QRA North) and Neuburg Air Base (QRA South), with alternate QRA bases in Nörvenich and Rostock-Laage Airport.

=== Hungary ===
The Hungarian Air Command and Control Centre is in Veszprém. The QRA base is at the Kecskemét Air Base. The Fighter Squadron Puma operates JAS-39C/D Gripen fighters. The Hungarian Gripens are responsible for the air police service over Slovenia.

=== Iceland ===
Iceland, though a member of NATO, has no standing armed forces. Other NATO nations provide periodic air defence at the NATO QRA standard as part of NATO Icelandic Air Policing.

=== Italy ===
Italian Air Force squadrons equipped with Typhoon and F-35 jets provide QRA coverage on a rotational basis. These squadrons are based at Grosseto Air Base in Tuscany (IX Gruppo of 4º Stormo), Gioia del Colle Air Base in Apulia (10° Gruppo and 12° Gruppo of 36º Stormo), Trapani Air Base in Sicily (18° Gruppo of 37° Stormo), and Istrana Air Base in Veneto (132° Gruppo of 51° Stormo), all of them operating Typhoons. More recently the F-35As based at Amendola Air Base in Apulia (13° Gruppo of 32° Stormo) have been given QRA tasks as well, and F-35s at Ghedi Air Base in Lombardy will be on QRA too.

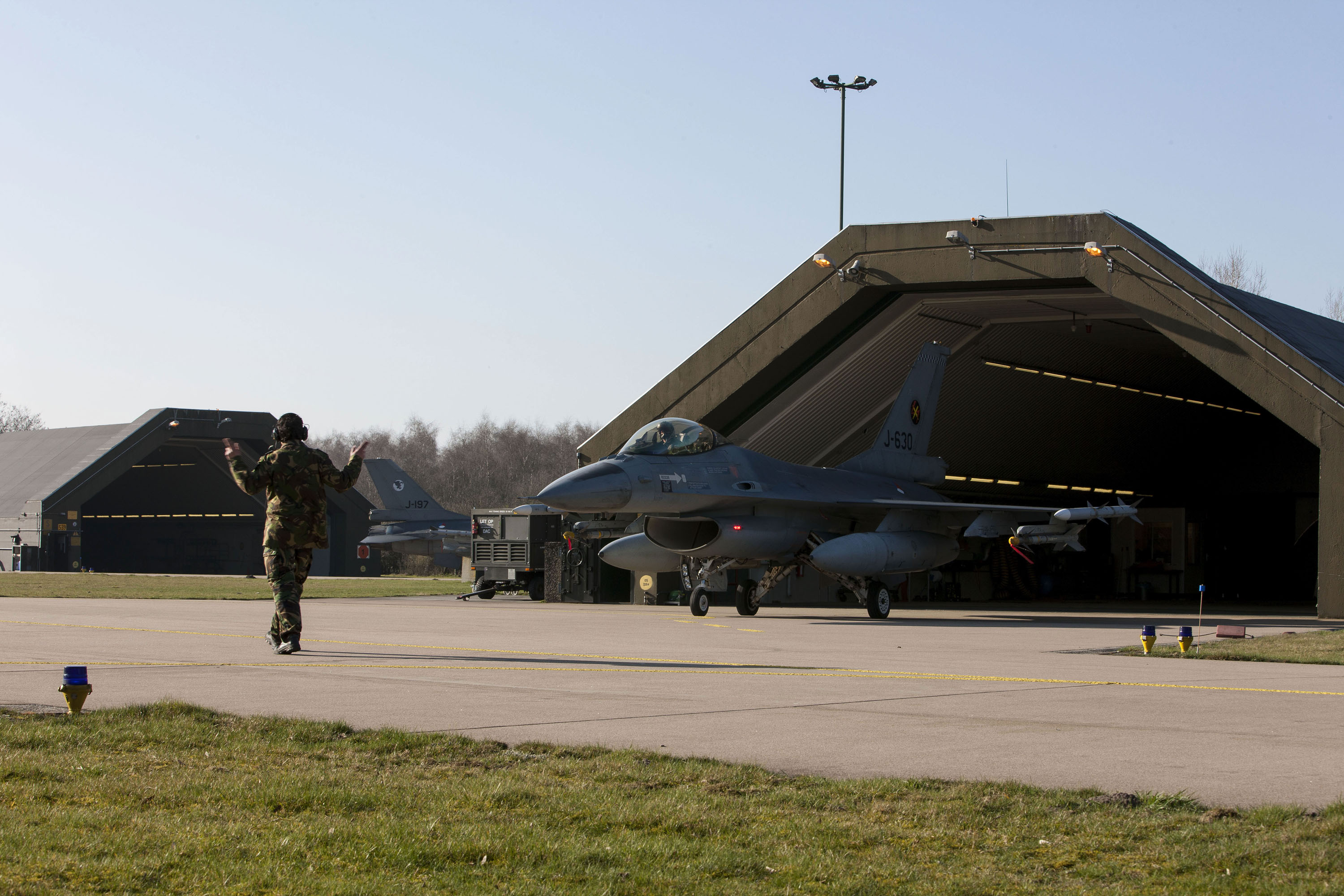
Dutch Quick Reaction Alert F-16 aircraft

=== Netherlands ===
The Royal Netherlands Air Force (RNLAF) have F-35 aircraft at Volkel Air Base or Leeuwarden Air Base on high alert. They intercept once notified by the Air Operations Control Station Nieuw-Milligen, near Apeldoorn in Gelderland. The RNLAF alternates the responsibilities for QRA above Benelux with the Belgian Air Component every four months since 2016/2017.

=== Norway ===
The Royal Norwegian Air Force Quick Reaction Alert force consists of two F-35s on high alert from Evenes Air Station.

=== Romania ===
The Romanian CRC is at Balotești in southern Romania, near Bucharest. The Romanian Air Force operates F-16 Fighting Falcons on QRA duty, which carry AIM-9X and AIM-120C missiles. As of 2026, two squadrons are operational:

- Escadrila 48 Vânătoare (48th Fighter Squadron) at the RoAF 71st Air Base (Baza 71 Aeriană) at Câmpia Turzii in central Romania;
- Escadrila 53 Vânătoare (53rd Fighter Squadron) at the RoAF 86th Air Base (Baza 86 Aeriană) at Borcea in south-east Romania.

=== Slovakia ===
The Air Force Command of the Slovak Air Force is in Zvolen. The 1st Tactical Squadron of the 81st Wing is waiting for the arrival of the final four F-16V at Sliač Air Base. Previously, Slovak airspace was guarded by the German Air Force, Czech Air Force, Polish Air Force and Hungarian Air Force until 28 October 2026, when Slovak F-16 Block-70s took over QRA duty.

The QRA F-16s are armed with two AIM-9X Sidewinder air-to-air missiles and currently operate from Malacky Air Base, until the reconstruction of Sliač Air Base is complete.

=== Spain ===
The Spanish Air Force and Space Force establishes a number of multipurpose fighter units that take turns among themselves. On the one hand, there are four units dependent on the Air Combat Command (MACOM) that are responsible for protecting the airspace.

The QRAs are attended to by different predisposed units, which follow an action plan, in which several Air Force aircraft are prepared to respond to the alert within a maximum time of 15 minutes. A single base is not established as an operations center that is responsible for these activities, but there are several in Spanish territory that are "on duty" to respond to any requirement.

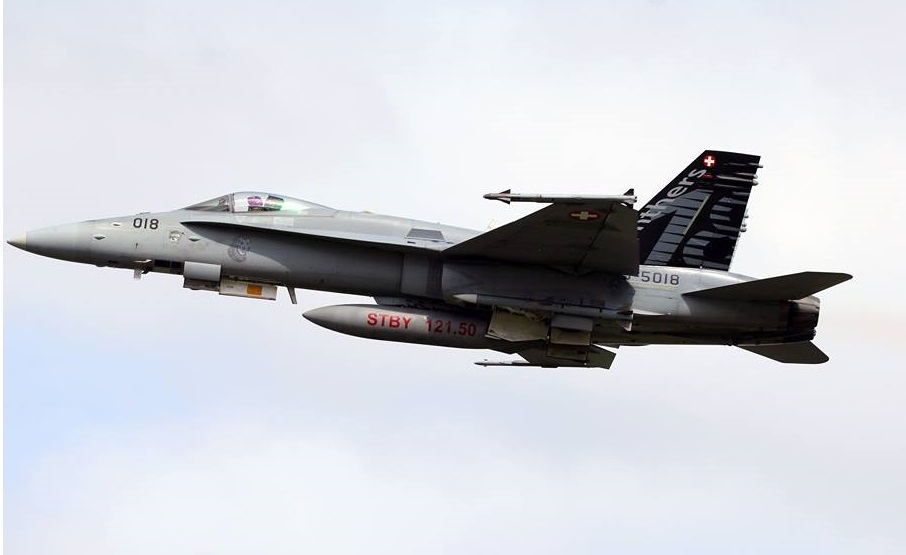
A Swiss QRA F/A-18 in 2016

=== Switzerland ===
The main base for the QRA of the Swiss Air Force is Payerne Air Base. The QRA also operates from Emmen Air Base and Meiringen Air Base for several weeks per year. Zurich Airport, Geneva Airport and Sion Airport serve as alternative locations. All QRA operations are guided by the Operations Center (EZ-LUV)/CRC at Dübendorf Air Base. The Swiss QRA are equipped with F/A-18C/D.

=== Turkey ===
Merzifon Air Base of the TuAF (Türk Hava Kuvvetleri), in northern Turkey, has one F-16 squadrons (built by TAI) with the 5th Air Wing (5 Ana Jet Üs). Bandırma Air Base has two F-16 squadrons of the 6th Air Wing. The Turkish CRC is at Ahlatlıbel near Ankara.

=== United Kingdom ===
Currently there are two QRA RAF stations, of 1 Group.

- RAF Coningsby in Lincolnshire looks after the southern sector of the UK, known as QRA South, with 3 Sqn and 11 Sqn.
- RAF Lossiemouth in Moray protects the northern sector of the UK, referred to as QRA North, hosted by 1 Sqn, 2 Sqn and 6 Sqn.

== History ==
Quick Reaction Alert is the current iteration of scrambling, developed by RAF Fighter Command in the Battle of Britain. International boundaries were three miles off the coast.

=== Austria ===
On October 18 2002, a US DC-10 requested to enter Austrian airspace; it was intercepted by two Austrian SAAB fighter aircraft, but the aircraft turned out to be a McDonnell Douglas KC-10 Extender, with two Lockheed F-117 Nighthawk aircraft being refuelled.

=== Germany ===
RAF Wildenrath provided air defence cover for Royal Air Force Germany (RAFG), which flew Phantoms with 92 Sqn and 19 Sqn until 1991. The last QRA sortie at RAF Wildenrath was on Wednesday 2 October 1991.

=== Italy ===
The first country to put the Typhoon onto QRA duty was Italy in December 2005, by IX Gruppo of 4º Stormo. 12° Gruppo of 36º Stormo followed in July 2007 and 10° Gruppo in July 2010. Typhoons replaced the F-16A/ADF of 37° Stormo at Trapani from May 2012. From March 2018 the F-35 of 32° Stormo based in Amendola, has implemented the QRA assets.

=== Spain ===
111 Sqn put the first Typhoon on QRA duty in July 2008, followed by 142 Sqn of Ala 14, and later 141 Sqn.

=== Romania ===
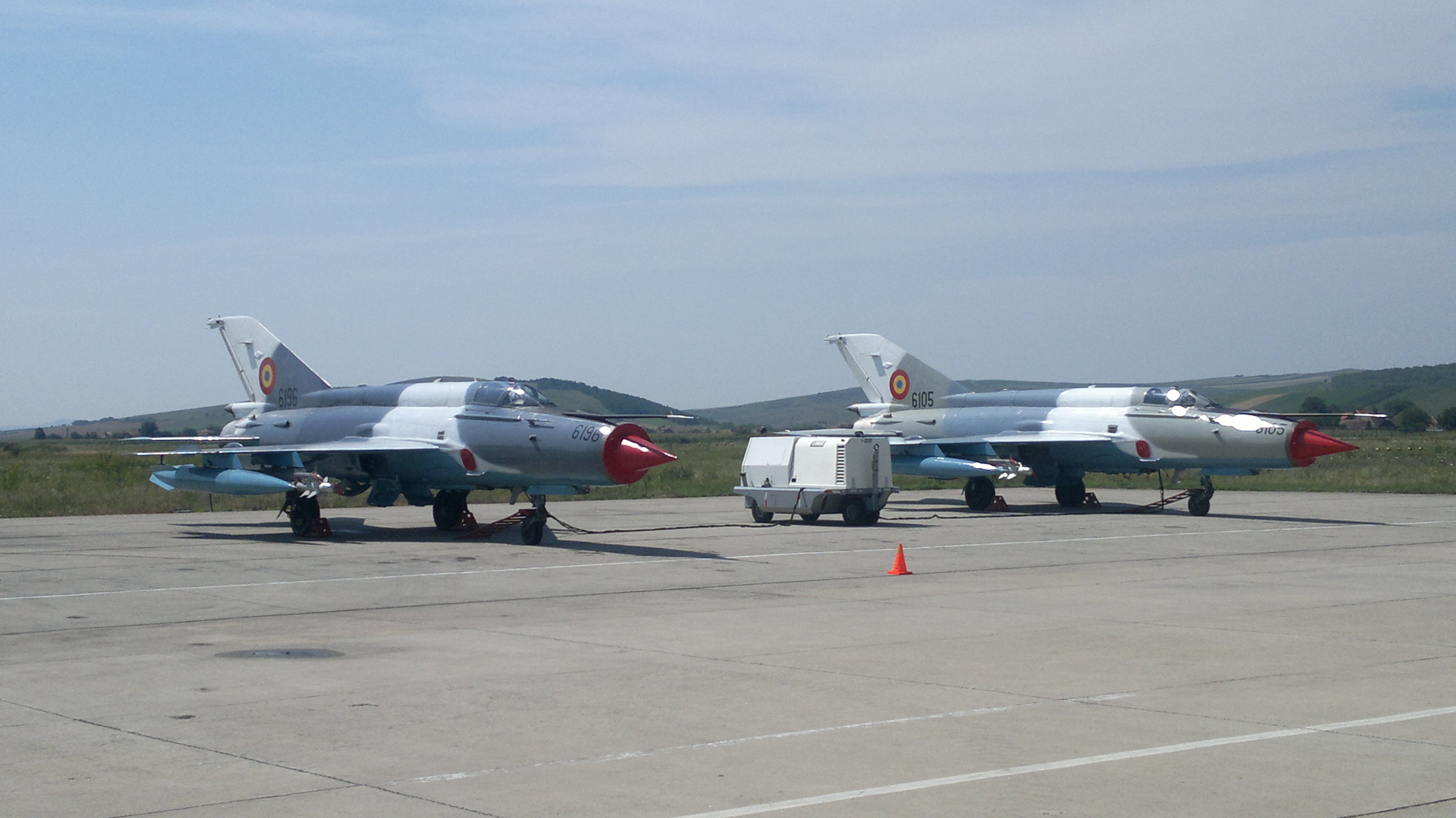
Pair of MiG-21 LanceRs on SLP-PA duty in 2011

In Romania, the Quick Reaction Alert is known as Serviciul de Luptă Permanent - Poliție Aeriană (SLP-PA, "Permanent Combat Service - Air Policing"), named so since the country joined NATO. The concept of maintaining jet fighters on alert for responding to aerial threats in Romania during peacetime was established in 1951, shortly after the delivery of the first Yak-23 fighters.

Referred to as Serviciul de Luptă Permanent (SLP, "Permanent Combat Service"), the mission was defined as maintaining a pair of fighters known as a "celulă" (lit. 'cell', a two-ship formation), on high response readiness. During the Cold War, the SLP missions were divided into three reaction levels: SPL-3 (Stare de Pregătire pentru Luptă gradul 3, "Combat Readiness Level 3"), SPL-2, and SPL-1. For SPL-3, the response time was within 20 minutes. SPL-2 level required the ground crews and pilots to remain close to their aircraft within a so-called "alarm cell" (celulă de alarmă), and be able to get in the air within 8-12 minutes. The highest level meant the pilots remained in their cockpits, while the aircraft were kept fully prepared and coupled to a ground power unit. The fastest takeoff time at this level was within five minutes.

The first instance of an SLP mission took place in 1952, when a Yak-23 was scrambled to intercept a Soviet Ilyushin Il-28 which had entered Romanian airspace. In the following years, Romanian fighters continued to respond to various incidents involving both Soviet and NATO aircraft flying close to or into Romanian airspace. With the Soviet invasion of Czechoslovakia in 1968, the number of aircraft and crews on SLP duty was doubled over a several-month period. After a Romanian BN-2 Islander and two airmen managed to defect in 1978, it was decided to add armed IAR 316 helicopters to the SLP duty with the role of intercepting slow-flying aircraft. Another notable incident took place during the Romanian revolution of 1989, when fighter jets and helicopters on the SLP mission conducted 52 fighter and 26 helicopter sorties to monitor the airspace amid false rumours and electronic warfare jamming.

In the 1990s, although the general characteristics of SLP missions did not change, the country underwent changes in doctrine and equipment to align with NATO standards. At this time, aircraft on SLP duty decreased from 18 jets and eight helicopters to just four jets. In 2009, the Extended Permanent Combat Service - Air Policing (SLP-PAE) was established, adding IAR 99 jets from the 95th Air Base and IAR 330 SOCAT helicopters from the 71st and 95th air bases to the already existing SLP-PA missions to intercept aircraft operating at low altitudes and speeds.

Following the 2014 Russian annexation of Crimea, allied aircraft began supplementing the Romanian Air Force on QRA air policing duties as part of the NATO enhanced Air Policing mission. Since the start of Russia's war in Ukraine in 2022, Romanian and allied aircraft conducted an increasing number of QRA responses. On the first day of the invasion, a pair of Romanian F-16s intercepted a Ukrainian Su-27 in national airspace and escorted it to a Romanian air base. Romanian fighter jets further shot down three Russian one-way attack drones in three separate incidents in 2026.

=== United Kingdom ===
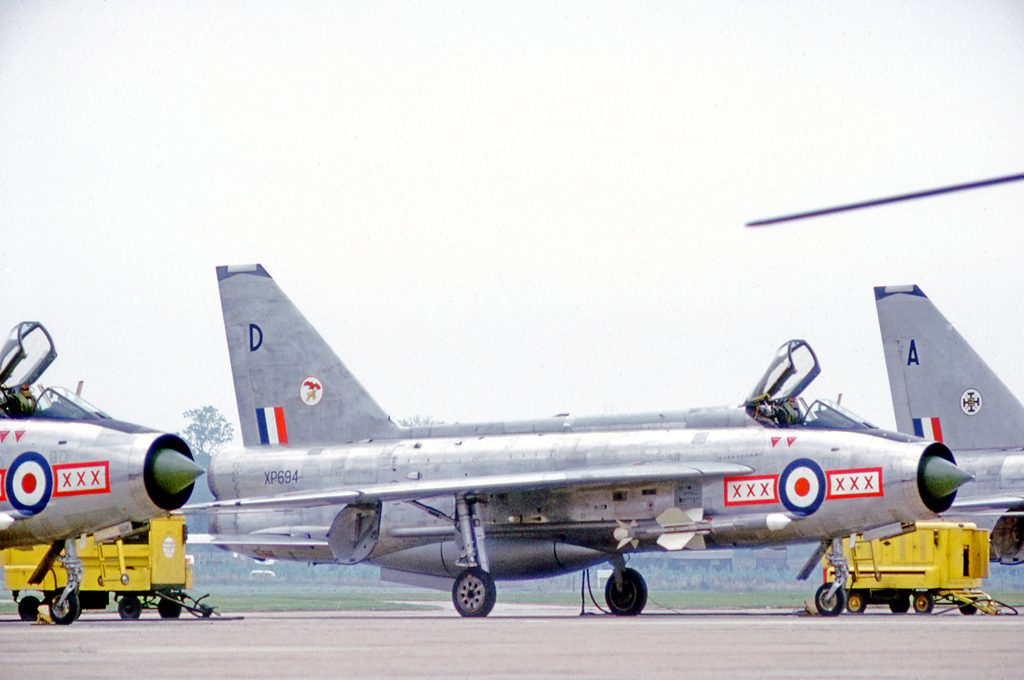
A Lightning F.3 XP694 of 29 Sqn at RAF Wattisham in September 1972

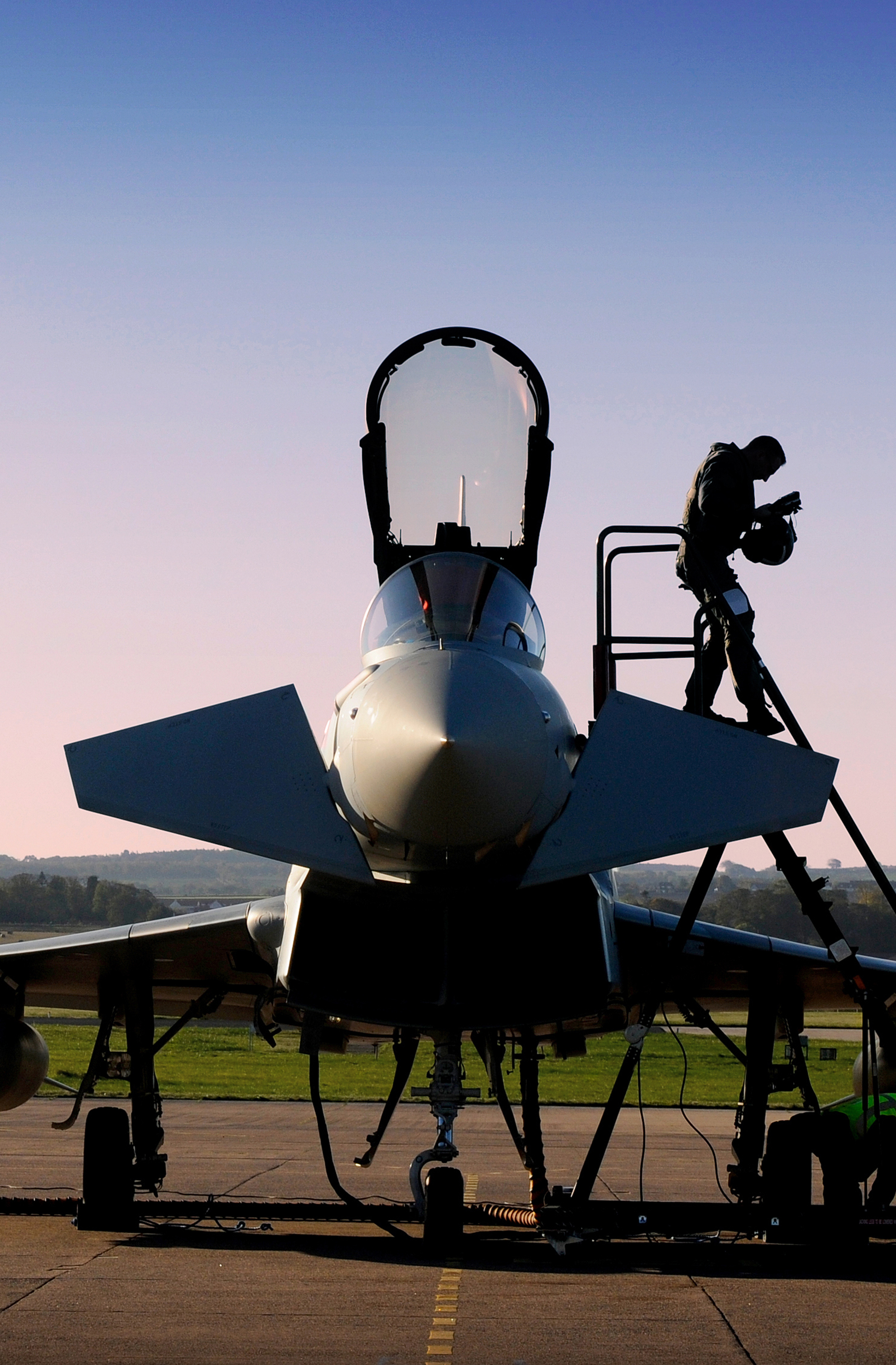
A QRA pilot at RAF Leuchars in October 2010

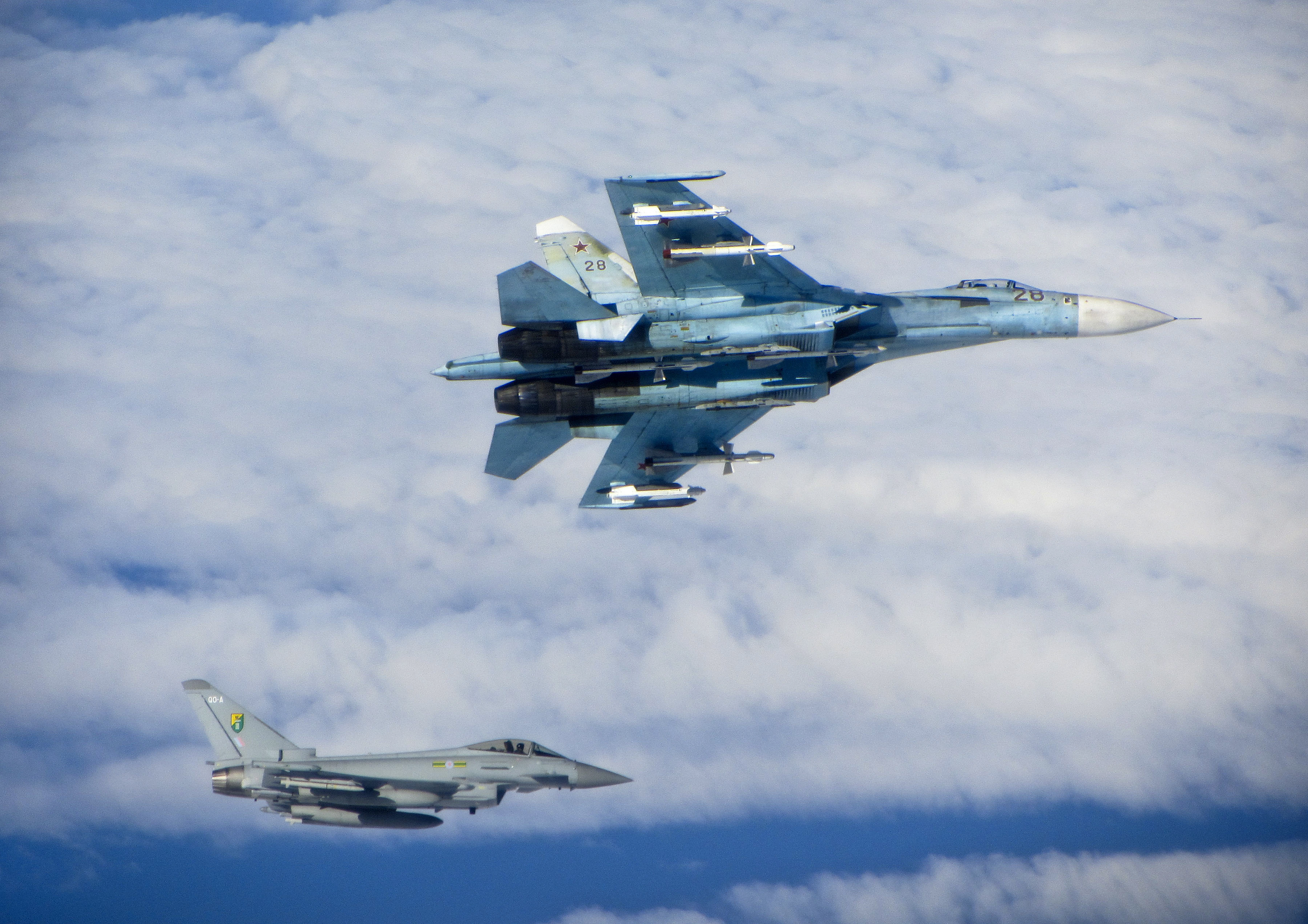
RAF Typhoon of 3 Sqn intercepts a Russian Flanker Sukhoi Su-27 over the Baltic states in June 2014. The aircraft were at Šiauliai from March 2014 with Operation Azotize

In the 1950s and 1960s, training as a fighter controller in the UK was at MRS Bawdsey (RAF Bawdsey). The main central control was known as ADOC, which monitored the UK Air Defence Region (UK ADR). It was similar to the USA's and Canada's NORAD at Peterson Air Force Base. The ROTOR system was developed in the 1950s.

Before computers arrived in the 1970s, the Russian aircraft were plotted on a map, mainly by WRAF personnel. 11 Group at RAF Bentley Priory from 1968 and RAF High Wycombe from 1972, looked after the UK's air defence until the 1990s. High Wycombe today has the European Air Group. The Ilyushin Il-18 Coot would fly in the 1980s on Ferret missions over the North Sea. The Phantom would be in the air in under two minutes.

43 Sqn, the Fighting Cocks, operated the Phantom from Leuchars from September 1969, along with 23 Sqn, the Red Eagles and 11 Sqn, the Twin Eagles. 56 Sqn, the Firebirds, operated the Phantom in the 1970s from Suffolk. In 1979, an average of 5 Russian aircraft a week entered British airspace. The tankers at Marham were from 55 Sqn and 57 Sqn.

Every QRA alert required a Victor tanker from RAF Marham in Norfolk, with the codename Dragonfly. One fighter squadron would be on QRA for six month shifts. The Phantom had much better range than the Lightning, and had far-better look down radar, but the Lightning had better performance.

The RAF Phantom variant had Spey engines, which were not intentionally designed for the aircraft, and gave lower performance. It had an advanced jam-resistant inertial navigation system but the RAF Phantoms could not take off immediately as this inertial system had to align first. The Lightning left service in 1988 and the Phantom in 1992. When the Tornado F.3 arrived, the RAF QRA duty had an aircraft with complete night-vision capabilities and could connect to the Sentry aircraft.

In the 1960s, Southern Q was maintained by the Lightnings of 5 Sqn at RAF Binbrook and those of 29 Sqn and 111 Squadron at RAF Wattisham. Southern Q was rotated around the three RAF bases. The Lightning left QRA duty on Wednesday 27 April 1988, with last flight in July 1988.

RAF Leeming took over Southern Q from RAF Coningsby in 1988. 11 Sqn left RAF Leeming in October 2005. In June 2007, 3 Sqn at RAF Coningsby took over Southern Q from the Tornados of 25 Sqn at RAF Leeming in North Yorkshire. The Typhoons of 3 Sqn had their first scramble in August 2007 when they intercepted a Russian Bear. 3 Sqn took over all of Southern Q from April 2008.

44 year old Pavel Grachev, the Minister of Defence (Russia) from 1992-96, was shown around RAF Leuchars on Thursday 23 July 1992, being shown the Tornado F3 QRA aircraft of 43 Squadron; he apparently enjoyed the 'hospitality' of the Scottish guests.

In August 2007 the Russians had begun to launch long-distance patrols after a 15-year hiatus. Typhoons arrived at RAF Leuchars with 6 Sqn from September 2010, performing their first QRA scramble in January 2011. Typhoons joined 1 Sqn from September 2012. 6 Sqn moved to Lossiemouth in June 2014, with 1 Sqn moving in August 2014. QRA North was moved from RAF Leuchars to RAF Lossiemouth in September 2014. The first QRA sortie from Lossiemouth was on 19 September 2014 with 6 Sqn.

==== 2012 Olympics ====
To cover the security for the 2012 Summer Olympics, part of QRA South was briefly deployed from RAF Coningsby to operate from RAF Northolt.

== Security incidents ==
- 1969 RAF Mildenhall C-130 theft, two French QRA aircraft took off
- Wednesday 7 January 1976, a Lightning 'XP659' collided with a Piper Aztec 'G-BAJX' of Lease Air, travelling from Gothenburg, with pilot Arthur Ramsden, a former wartime bomber pilot, aged 52, and six people, at 600 ft; the Piper landed at Kirmington; the Aztec had been picked up as an unidentified aircraft
- On 25 September 1979 a light aircraft 'G-BGHR' left at 1pm from Stansted airport; it descended from 31,000ft to 12,000ft, in an exercise at 2.36pm; it flew in circles, after the pilot became ill from hypoxia, and the plane began to make four-mile-wide circular paths for six hours, moving south, and crashed in a French vineyard at Le Tremblay at 8.20pm, 12 miles south-east of Nantes; the aircraft was followed by an RAF Nimrod over the English Channel, and two French Air Force Mirage III and three Mirage F1 followed from 1810 to 2010; French pilots were given orders to shoot the plane down, if it was nearing a town; on the aircraft were Tom Lampitt, aged 47, from Loom Lane, Radlett in Hertfordshire, a former pilot of Aer Lingus, and Lieutenant-Colonel Fausto Aguiar de Barros Valla, from Sacavém in Portugal, of the Portuguese Army; Tom Lampitt, originally from New Penshaw, had flown in 43 Sqn at Leuchars in an aerobatics team with Peter Bairsto
- 1983 Scotland Learjet 25 crash, on Wednesday 18 May 1983, a pilotless Learjet 25 flew across the North Sea approaching Scotland, crashing 260 miles off Stornoway at around 8.30pm; a Nimrod from RAF Kinloss searched for wreckage; the West German aircraft had taken off from Vienna International Airport at 2.53pm, flying at around 40,000 ft (FL390) across Holland; radio contact had been lost near Fulda in West Germany at 3.49pm; the Learjet had been followed by Dutch QRA pilots, who had likewise seen no-one at the controls; the aircraft 'D-CDPD' was registered by Air Traffic GmbH of Munich; the pilot was believed to be Peter Blangman; the Learjet was intercepted by an RAF Phantom over Loch Rannoch, with pilot 23 year old Flying Officer Mark Hanna, the son of Ray Hanna, and navigator 28 year old Flt Lt John Marr, of Portsmouth, from 111 Sqn at Leuchars; the RAF aircrew could see no-one in the cockpit, from a distance of 30 feet; the Learjet flew at around 450mph: the Phantom followed the aircraft to around 150 miles west of Kinloss, as there was no tanker aircraft; from there the Learjet was followed by another QRA RAF Phantom from RAF Coningsby; it crossed the Outer Hebrides at 5.30pm
- 1989 Belgium MiG-23 crash, on 4 July 1989, where multiple QRA aircraft were scrambled
- Helios Airways Flight 522, on 14 August 2005, intercepted by two Greek F-16 aircraft from Nea Anchialos National Airport
- 2014 Olsberg mid-air collision, on 23 June 2014, a QRA exercise resulted in a mid-air collision between a Learjet 35 and a German Air Force aircraft from Nörvenich Air Base
- 2018 Horizon Air Bombardier Q400 incident, on 10 August 2018 in the western US
- 2022 Baltic Sea Cessna Citation crash

== Non-NATO security incidents ==
- Ryanair Flight 4978 in May 2021, ordered to divert from the scheduled route
- 1987 Okinawan Tu-16 airspace violation
- Defection of Viktor Belenko
- Mathias Rust, landed on the Bolshoy Moskvoretsky Bridge on 28 May 1987 aged 18, in his Cessna 172, flying from Uetersen Airfield in Germany, via Helsinki-Malmi Airport; a MiG-23 intercepted him, but the Soviet fighter pilot was told to leave the aircraft alone. The Soviet Air Defence Forces, known as the PVO, had given the light aircraft an incorrect IFF identification, and the aircraft was also misidentified as a low-flying helicopter, which was likely of no defence importance. It was also the annual Border Guards Day, which provided much distraction.
- 1960 RB-47 shootdown incident
- Violations of Japanese airspace

== See also ==
- Index of aviation articles
- List of established military terms
- Air Command and Control System (ACCS)
- Baltic Air Policing
- Cold War II
- Minimum interval takeoff
- Ground-controlled interception
- NATO Integrated Air Defense System (NADGE, or NATO Air Defence Ground Environment in the 1950s)

== Bibliography ==
- Eckert, Tobias (2016). STANAG 7001 | Formation Flying (PDF). IVAO Special Operations Department.
