= Combined Air Operations Centre =

Multinational headquarters for tactical and operational control of NATO Air Forces

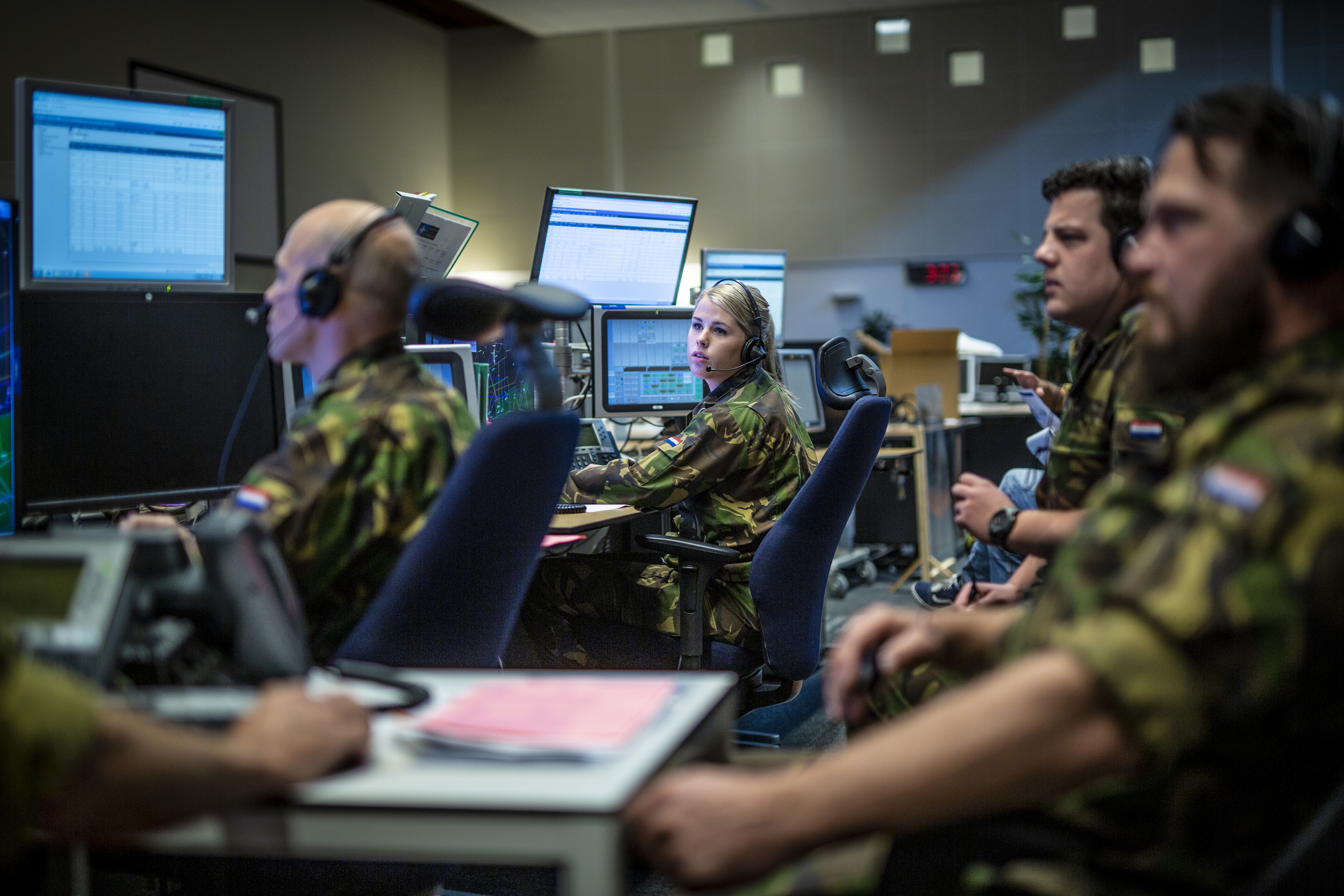
Combined Air Operations Centres monitor airspace throughout Europe

Combined Air Operations Centres (CAOCs) are multinational headquarters for tactical and operational control of NATO Air Forces below the Joint Force Command level. They operate within the NATO Integrated Air Defense System (NATINADS) framework.

Within the European NATO command structure, they are subordinate to NATO's Allied Air Command (AIRCOM), and superior to Control and Reporting Centres, national airspace control centres, and Regional Airspace Surveillance Coordination Centres (RASCC) such as BALTNET. NATO may also operate in Europe with static and deployable CAOCs.

Predecessor organisations of the CAOC were Air Tactical Operations Centre (ATOC) and Air Defence Operations Centre (ADOC). Until 1980 the two HQs for air attack and air defence operated autonomously.

== Active locations ==
Active NATO Combined Air Operations Centres
Designation	Location	Country	Notes	Ref.
CAOC ENBO	Bodø Air Base	Norway	Responsible for operations in the High North	
CAOC UE	Uedem	Germany	Responsible for operations in Northern Europe, north of the Alps	
CAOC TJ	Torrejón Air Base	Spain	Responsible for operations in Southern Europe, south of the Alps	
DACCC PR	Poggio Renatico Air Base	Italy	Deployable Air Command and Control Centre	

Emblems of the Combined Air Operations Centres
Combined Air Operations Centre Bodø

Combined Air Operations Centre Uedem

Combined Air Operations Centre Torrejón

Deployable Air Command and Control Centre

== Former locations ==
Former NATO Combined Air Operations Centres
Designation	Location	Country	Year deactivated	Notes	Ref.
CAOC 1	Finderup	Denmark	2008	Replaced at same location by CAOC Finderup	
CAOC 2	Uedem	Germany	2008	Replaced at same location by Deployable CAOC Uedem Deployable	
CAOC 3	Reitan	Norway	2008	Responsibility transferred to CAOC Finderup	
CAOC 4	Meßstetten	Germany	2008	Responsibility transferred to CAOC Uedem	
CAOC 5	Poggio Renatico Air Base	Italy	2013	Replaced at same location by Deployable CAOC	
CAOC 6	Eskişehir	Turkey	2013	Responsibility transferred to CAOC Torrejón	
CAOC 7	Larissa	Greece	2013	Responsibility transferred to CAOC Torrejón	
CAOC 8	Torrejón Air Base	Spain	2013	Replaced at same location by CAOC Torrejón	
CAOC 9	RAF High Wycombe	United Kingdom	2008	Responsibility transferred to CAOC Finderup	
CAOC 10	Lisbon	Portugal	2013	Responsibility transferred to CAOC Torrejon	
CAOC F	Finderup	Denmark	2013	Responsibility moved to CAOC Uedem	
Balkans CAOC	Vicenza	Italy	2001	Controlled the 1999 NATO aerial bombing campaign against the Federal Republic of Yugoslavia during the Kosovo War	
DCAOC UD	Uedem	Germany	2013	Deployable CAOC Uedem, Replaced at same location by CAOC UD	

== See also ==
- Quick Reaction Alert, activity meant to guard a nation's airspace. CAOCs have the role of commanding QRA missions in NATO airspace.
