= Allied Air Command =

Central command for all NATO air and space forces

- Coat of arms
- Founded: 1 January 2013
- Allegiance: NATO
- Branch: Air warfare
- Type: Tactical level command
- Role: Command and control of air&space forces
- Part of: Allied Command Operations
- Headquarters: Ramstein Air Base, Rhineland-Palatinate, Germany
- Website: ac.nato.int

Commanders
- Commander: Lieutenant General Jason T. Hinds United States Air Force
- Deputy Commander: Lieutenant General Guillaume Thomas French Air and Space Force
- Chief of staff: BRG Frank Gräfe; German Air Force

The Allied Air Command (abbr. AIRCOM) is the central command of all NATO air and space forces and the Commander Allied Air Command is the prime air and space advisor to the Alliance. When directed by the Supreme Allied Commander Europe (SACEUR), it provides the core of the headquarters responsible for the conduct of air operations. The command is based at the Ramstein Air Base in Germany.

== History ==
=== Post Cold War ===
Originally established in 1974 as Allied Air Forces Central Europe (AAFCE) the command's task was to provide centralized direction and control for NATO air forces in the European Central Region corresponding to West Germany south of the river Elbe, Belgium, the Netherlands and Luxembourg.

During the early 1990s, following the relaxation of the tensions between East and West, a major reorganization of the NATO command and control structure was undertaken. As part of this, and to take account of the decrease in the number of allied aircraft in Europe, a rationalization of the Central Region air force headquarters occurred in 1993 with the closing of Second Allied Tactical Air Force and Fourth Allied Tactical Air Force and the expansion of AAFCE to meet the new increased task as it absorbed functions previously undertaken by the two subordinate ATAFs.

This change in structure was marked by a ceremony at Ramstein on 1 July 1993, when the headquarters was officially renamed AIRCENT. A further consequence of NATO's reorganization was an increase in the area of responsibility for Allied Forces Central Europe by the addition, on 1 January 1994, of Denmark and the northern parts of Germany, both of which were previously under NATO's Allied Forces Northern Europe command. As a result, Denmark joined the six nations, which staffed the headquarters since its inception: Belgium, Canada, Germany, the Netherlands, the United Kingdom and the United States.

=== NATO expansion ===
On 3 March 2000, AIRNORTHWEST (High Wycombe, UK) and AIRCENT were amalgamated. The new command was named AIRNORTH and also took over the air responsibilities of the former HQ BALTAP (which became JHQ NORTHEAST (Karup/DA)), and HQ NORTH (which became JHQ NORTH (Stavanger/NO)). HQ AIRNORTH now included also personnel from Norway, Hungary, Poland, the Czech Republic, Italy and Spain.

With the accession to NATO of seven new members (Bulgaria, Estonia, Latvia, Lithuania, Romania, Slovenia, Slovakia) in March 2004, the Baltic States Estonia, Latvia and Lithuania as well as Slovakia became a part of AIRNORTH. On 1 July 2004, AIRNORTH was renamed Component Command-Air Ramstein (CC AIR) and a new internal HQ-structure was implemented.

With effect of 1 March 2010 the command was renamed to Allied Air Command Ramstein and with effect from 1 January 2013, following the deactivation of Allied Air Command İzmir, the command was renamed Allied Air Command ('AIRCOM').

=== Lineage ===
Allied Air Command has previously been named as follows:

- 28 June 1974 – 1 July 1993 (Allied Air Forces Central Europe)
- 1 July 1993 – 3 March 2000 (AIRCENT)
- 3 March 2000 – March 2004 (AIRNORTH)
- March 2004 – 2010 (Component Command-Air Headquarters Ramstein)
- 2010 – 1 January 2013 (Headquarters Allied Air Command Ramstein)
- 1 January 2013 – present (Allied Air Command)

== Role ==
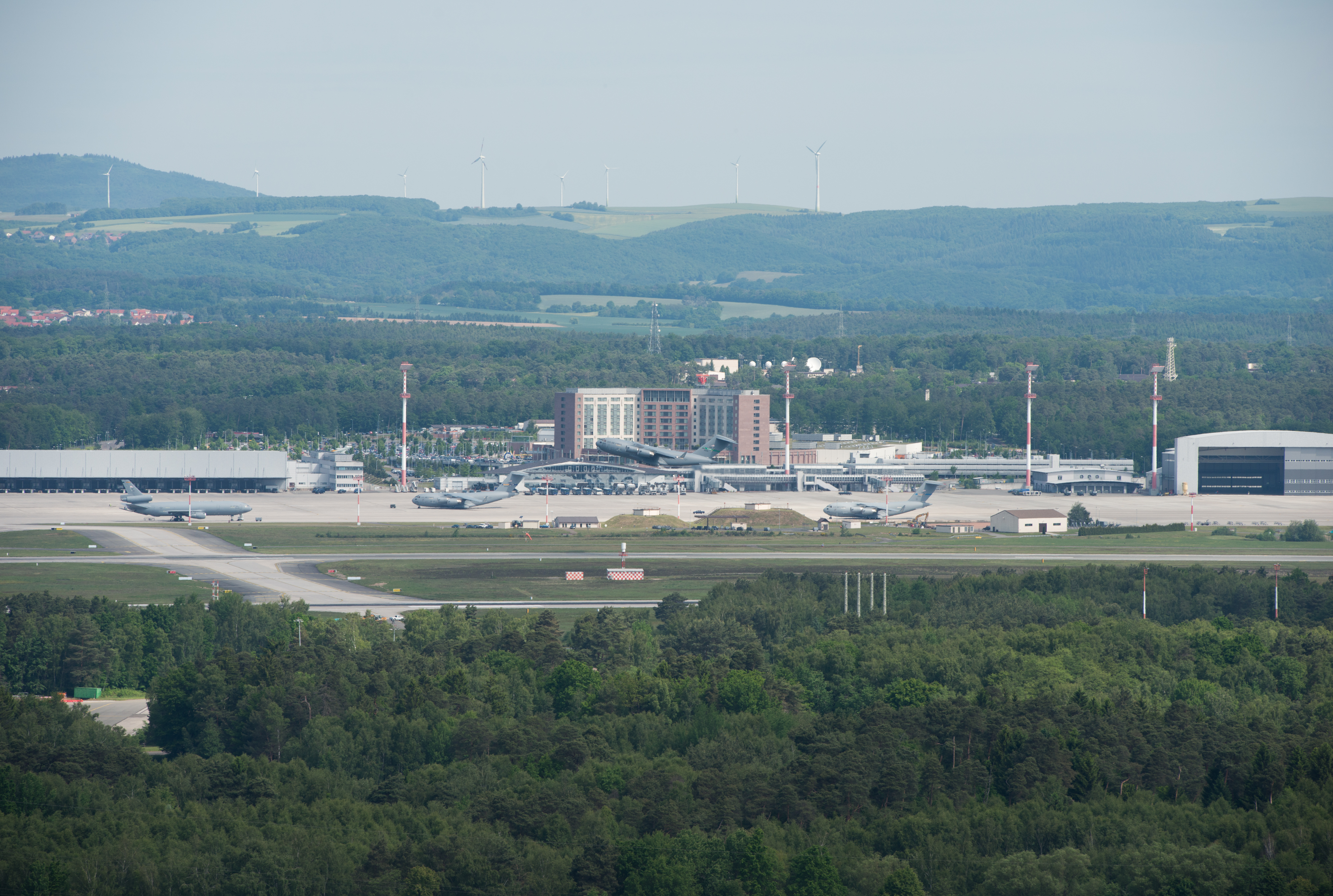
Allied Air Command is headquartered at Ramstein Air Base, Germany

Allied Air Command is tasked with planning and directing the air component of NATO operations and missions, as well as air and missile defence matters. It is NATO's principal air advisor and contributes to development and transformation, engagement and outreach within its area of expertise.

The command is headquartered at Ramstein Air Base in Germany, from where it can provide command and control for small joint air operations or perform as air component command to support a larger operation.

The commander of AIRCOM is currently a United States Air Force General who also serves in the U.S. national appointment of Commander United States Air Forces in Europe - Air Forces Africa. He is the designated Commander Allied Air Command for all air and space missions as tasked by SACEUR and the Air and Space Advisor to SACEUR. AIRCOM has a multinational staff, which may include liaison elements from other NATO headquarters and national commands as specified in agreements. The Deputy Air Commander is ordinarily a French or a British 3-star, now appointed by rotation.

One of previously subordinate activities of AIRCOM was Combined Air Operations Centre Finderup, in Denmark.

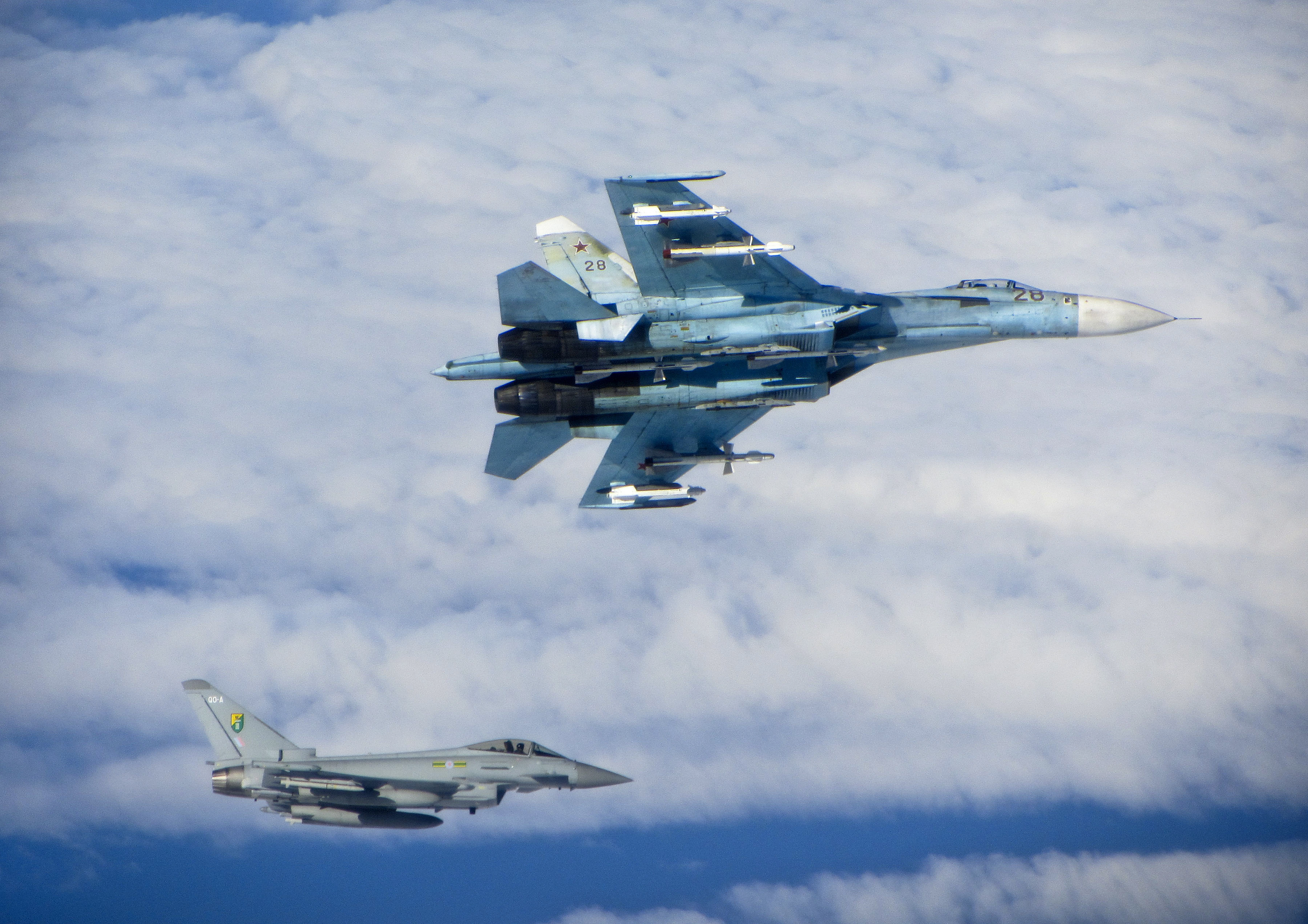
A Russian Air Force SU-27 Flanker is intercepted by an RAF Typhoon FGR4 as part of NATO's ongoing Baltic Air Policing mission

Subordinate to AIRCOM are Combined Air Operations Centre in Uedem, Combined Air Operations Centre in Torrejon, and Deployable Air Command and Control Centre in Poggio Renatico. The CAOC in Uedem's primary peacetime role is the tactical Command and Control of Quick- Reaction Alert Forces used to police NATO airspace above the Benelux countries, above Germany, Poland, the Czech Republic, Slovakia and the Baltic States (Baltic Air Policing). There are also over 50 Control and Reporting Centres and Points, plus linkages with civilian air traffic control networks.

Baltic Region Training Events (BRTE) are held designed to offer training opportunities for enhancing interoperability, building capabilities and continuing the integration of Estonia, Latvia and Lithuania.

AIRCOM is also in charge of the NATO Integrated Air Defense System (NATINADS) which controls not only the air forces assigned to active NATO duty but also gathers information and coordinates the activities of the radar and ground facilities of the member states.
