= 1969 RAF Mildenhall C-130 theft =

Theft and subsequent crash of a military plane

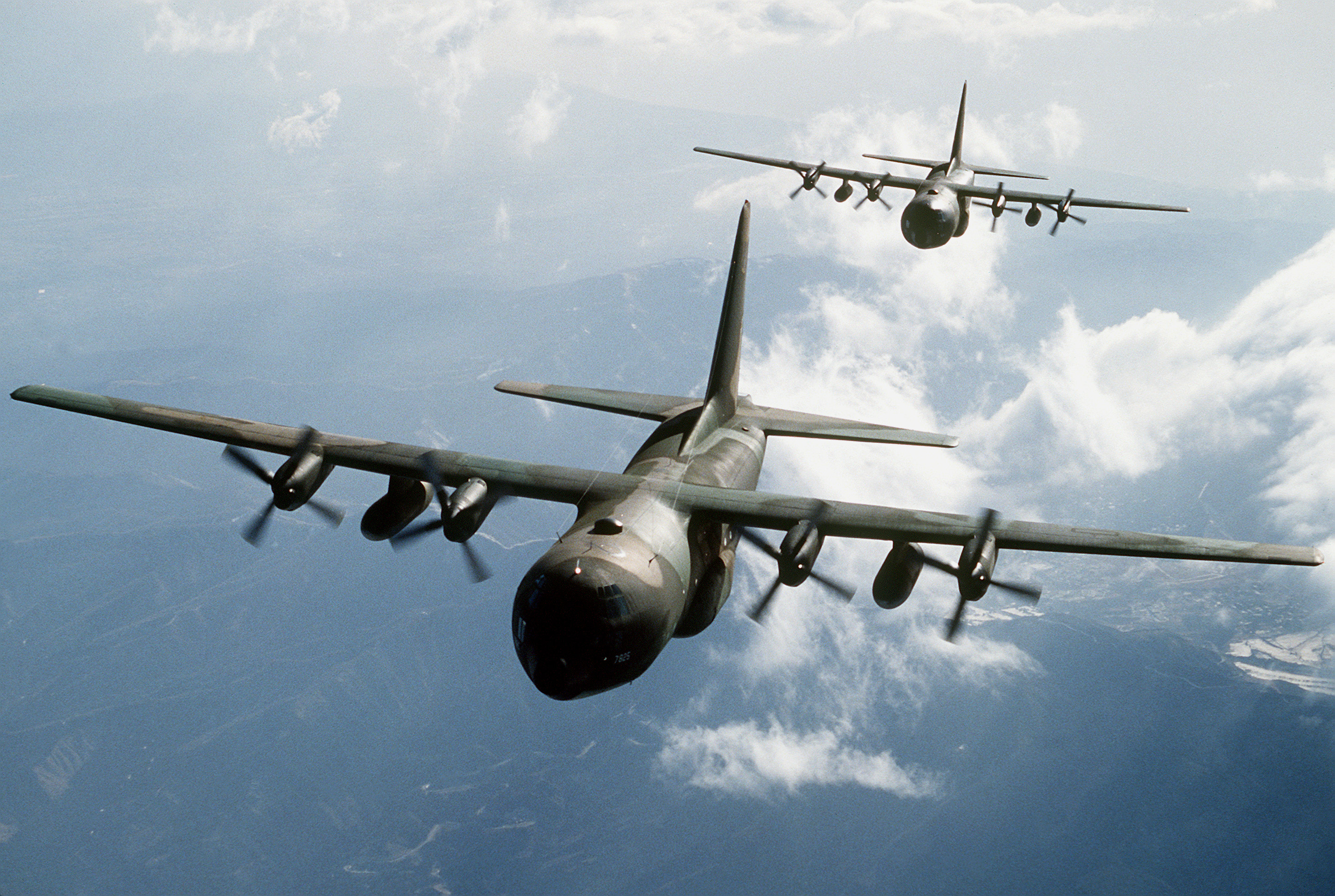
- A pair of C-130Es similar to the stolen aircraft

Incident
- Date: 23 May 1969
- Summary: Aircraft theft and disappearance
- Site: English Channel, Northwestern Europe

Aircraft
- Aircraft type: Lockheed C-130E Hercules
- Operator: United States Air Force
- Registration: 63-7789
- Flight origin: RAF Mildenhall
- Occupants: 1
- Fatalities: 1 (presumed)
- Survivors: 0 (presumed)

On 23 May 1969, a Lockheed C-130 Hercules of the United States Air Force (USAF) was stolen from RAF Mildenhall in Suffolk, England, by a USAF aircraft mechanic who ultimately crashed it into the English Channel. Though some parts of the plane washed up on the Channel Islands within days of the crash, the larger wreck remained undiscovered until November 2018, nearly 50 years later.

== Background ==
Sergeant Paul Meyer was an aircraft mechanic in the United States Air Force. At the age of 23 he was already a Vietnam veteran. He had married earlier that year and was close to his wife and stepchildren. While at Mildenhall, he had flashbacks and was homesick and unhappy. He was also a heavy drinker.

A few days before the theft he had requested to be transferred from Mildenhall to Langley Air Force Base but the request was turned down.

== Night of theft ==
On the night of 22 May 1969 he was at a military colleague's house party where he drank heavily and began to behave erratically and aggressively. His friends tried to persuade him to go to bed but he escaped through a window.

Shortly after, Suffolk Police found him on the A11 and he was arrested for being drunk and disorderly. He was escorted back to his barracks and told to sleep it off.

Instead of obeying orders he assumed the alias "Captain Epstein", went to a hangar where a Lockheed C-130E Hercules serial no. 63-7789 was and ordered it to be prepared. He had worked on it so knew the protocols to access it and had a working knowledge of how to fly it. The stolen aircraft took off at 05:08.

=== Call to wife ===
During the flight he was able to make a phone call to his then wife, Jane Meyer (now Mary Ann Jane Goodson) which lasted for more than an hour. The last twenty minutes of their conversation was recorded. At one point the voice of Colonel Kingery from Mildenhall interrupts.

Around 06:55 radar contact was lost with Meyer's aircraft and an hour and forty-five minutes after takeoff the C-130 crashed into the English Channel.

A few days later small parts from the missing C-130, including a life raft, washed up near the Channel Island of Alderney.

== Aftermath ==
=== Accident report ===
The accident report records that only two aircraft were dispatched to find Meyer, a C-130 from RAF Mildenhall and an F-100 from RAF Lakenheath. Neither aircraft established visual or radio contact.

French Air force fighters were scrambled.

=== Question of aircraft security raised in House of Commons ===
Eldon Griffiths, then MP for Bury St Edmunds, asked a question regarding the security of aircraft on military bases on 12 June 1969.

=== Allegations C-130 was shot down ===
Peter Nash was a senior aircraftman at RAF Wattisham with 29 Squadron. It was an airbase with a Quick Reaction Alert squadron. According to Nash, he was involved with preparing three English Electric Lightnings. Two of them took off, loaded with missiles.

In his 2011 book Lightning Boys Rick Groombridge claims that an American exchange pilot took over his aircraft at Wattisham and returned to base minus one missile. Groombridge declined to be interviewed by the BBC but stands by his story. Nash disputes this account - he was chief armourer and says both aircraft returned to base with all four missiles unused.

Nash says that a few weeks after the event he went on a course and met another armourer from RAF Chivenor. Nash says he was told that at least one Hawker Hunter was scrambled. The other armourer also claimed that the pilot in question returned to base minus missiles, that the pilot was met by RAF police for a secret debrief along with his plane's gun camera. Nash himself keeps an open mind but says it would be within the capabilities of the Hawker Hunter to have intercepted the missing aircraft. The scope for this claim must be viewed with some scepticism as RAF Hunters were never fitted for, nor ever carried air to air missiles. Some marks did carry air to ground rockets, and most types had four 30mm cannons.

== See also ==
- List of people who disappeared mysteriously at sea
