= Combined Air Operations Centre Finderup =

Combined Air Operations Centre Finderup (CAOC Finderup) was located on the Jutland peninsula, approximately 20 km west of Viborg in the middle of the Finderup military training area in Denmark. It was part of NATO's Air Policing mission and was responsible of the airspace around Iceland, Norway, Denmark and the United Kingdom. Under the NATO Integrated Air Defence System (NATINADS) concept, resources are allocated by nations to NATO for the purpose of Air Defence in peacetime. At the end of June 2013 the CAOC was deactivated and responsibility for its Air Policing Area was passed to Combined Air Operations Centre Uedem (CAOC Uedem) in Germany under the new NATO Force Structure.

== History ==
The bunker which houses CAOC Finderup was built between 1977 and 1985 as the wartime headquarters for NATO's Allied Forces Baltic Approaches (BALTAP). At the end of the Cold War, BALTAP was disbanded but a new command was activated as is subordinate air agency: Interim Combined Air Operations Centre No 1. NATO established 10 ICAOCs in all, roughly along national borders. In 2008 the 4 CAOCs in Norway, Denmark and the UK combined at CAOC Finderup, creating a much larger AOR it became the home of Interim CAOC1, which later became CAOC Finderup.

== Daily Operations ==
The primary task for CAOC Finderup is to conduct 24/7 Air Policing within its assigned Air Policing Area (APA) in peacetime. In case of crisis and wartime, the CAOC is tasked to be prepared to operate to its full capability at its Crisis Establishment or to augment another CAOC under the Joint Force Air Component (JFAC) concept.

== Crest ==
The crest for CAOC Finderup has, at its centre, the sword of the Air Component Command Ramstein. To the left and right of this protective sword are the nations of Iceland, the United Kingdom, Denmark and Norway, within whose airspace all NATO air activities are the responsibility of CAOC Finderup. Three aircraft tracks merge into one to symbolize the amalgamation of former CAOC 1 (Finderup, Denmark), CAOC 3 (Reitan, Norway) and CAOC 9 (High Wycombe, UK RAF High Wycombe). The NATO crest is in the top right and in the top left 3 waves indicate the 3 seas surrounding the host nation, Denmark.

== Support ==
The work of CAOC Finderup takes place in the bunker located at Operations Centre Finderup (OC Finderup). It is supported by a detachment of NCIA which is responsible for maintaining all telecommunication and information systems. Work is supported by the Joint Host Nation Support Group (JHNSG) which is responsible for real life support such as guarding, firefighting, catering and cleaning. In addition JHNSG are also responsible for administrating the NATO personnel in accordance with the NATO Status of Forces Agreement (SOFA).

== Peacetime Manning and Future ==
CAOC Finderup has a peacetime establishment of 125 posts of which Host Nation Denmark provides the majority similar to other CAOCs. Under MOU arrangements five other NATO nations; Denmark, Norway, the United Kingdom, Germany, Poland, Italy and Turkey contribute to the international community at Finderup. The commander's and deputy commander's positions are filled by Denmark and United Kingdom, respectively. At the end of June 2013 the CAOC will deactivate and responsibility for its Air Policing Area will pass to CAOC Uedem in Germany under the new NATO Force Structure.
