= RRH Benbecula =

Royal Air Force radar site in the Western Isles, Scotland

RRH Benbecula
- North Uist, Outer Hebrides in Scotland
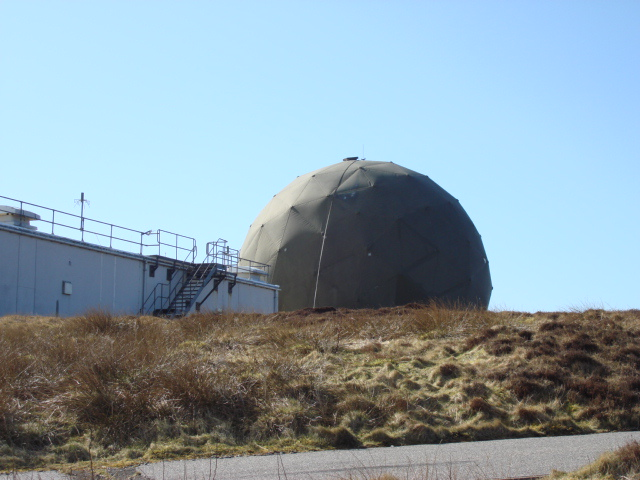
- Radar dome at RRH Benbecula

- Faireachail (Scottish Gaelic for 'Watchful' / 'On Guard')

Site information
- Type: Remote Radar Head
- Owner: Ministry of Defence
- Operator: Royal Air Force
- Controlled by: Air Command and Control Force
- Condition: Operational
- Radar type: Lockheed Martin AN/TPS-77 (Type 92) Air Defence Radar

Location
- Shown within the Outer Hebrides
- Coordinates: 57°37′02″N 007°26′46″W
- Area: 6 hectares (15 acres)

Site history
- Built: 1980
- In use: 1980–present

Garrison information
- Occupants: Radar Flight (North)

Remote Radar Head Benbecula or RRH Benbecula, is an air defence radar station operated by the Royal Air Force. Despite its name, it is not located on the nearby island of Benbecula; instead it is located on South Clettraval (Cleitreabhal a'Deas) on the isle of North Uist, 11 miles (17 km) from Lochmaddy in the Outer Hebrides of Scotland.

== History ==
=== Radar station ===
Although Benbecula Airport is now a civilian airfield, a military presence remained and the RAF Benbecula name continued when a radar station was established. A control and reporting centre, part of the UK Air Surveillance And Control System (ASACS), was constructed at the airfield which linked it to RAF Buchan in Aberdeenshire.

The station was downgraded in the late 1990s to a remote radar head and the RAF pulled-out of the main airfield site at Benbecula. Initially under the command and control of RAF Buchan, responsibility was transferred to RAF Boulmer in Northumberland in September 2004.

Benbecula operated several radar types until the Type 92 (more widely known out-with RAF service as the Lockheed Martin AN/FPS-117) came into service in the 1980s. The Type 92 was replaced in 2015 with a new Lockheed Martin AN/TPS-77 system. The new radar was funded by wind farm developers and was installed in order to help reduce the impact of interference from wind turbines.

=== Weapons range ===
The British Army also had a large presence in the Outer Hebrides, operating the Deep Sea Range on South Uist. This role was passed to the Defence Evaluation and Research Agency (eventually to become QinetiQ), who remain at the Benbecula and South Uist sites, collectively known as MOD Hebrides.

== Operations ==
The radar collects data as part of the UK Air Surveillance And Control System (ASACS) based at RAF Boulmer. From there the station is monitored and controlled to support the creation of the recognised air picture for the United Kingdom. The radar site also accommodates several types of VHF and UHF ground-to-air transmitters.

Radar Flight (North) of the ASACS Engineering & Logistics Squadron based at RAF Boulmer has command and control of RRH Buchan and ensures its operational availability.

As part of a major upgrade of RRH sites around the UK the MOD began a programme titled HYDRA in 2020 to install new communications buildings, radar towers and perimeter security.

== See also ==
- Improved United Kingdom Air Defence Ground Environment – UK air defence radar system in the UK between the 1990s and 2000s
- Linesman/Mediator – UK air defence radar system in the UK between the 1960s and 1984
- List of Royal Air Force stations
- NATO Integrated Air Defense System
- Armed forces in Scotland
- Military history of Scotland
