= AN/TPY-4 =

Air defense radar

TPY-4 Multi-Mission Radar
- Country of origin: United States
- Manufacturer: Lockheed Martin
- Designer: Lockheed Martin
- Type: 3D long range detection, AESA radar with GaN TRM (transmit and receive modules)
- Frequency: 1.215 to 1.4 GHz (L band)
- RPM: up to 6, or stop/stare mode
- Range: 555 km (300 nmi) in rotation, 1,000 km (540 nmi) in stop/stare mode
- Altitude: 0 to 30,500 m (0 to 100,066 ft)
- Azimuth: 360° in rotation, +/− 45° in stop/stare mode
- Elevation: −6° to 38° (search elevation), −6° to 90° (track elevation)

The AN/TPY-4 is a ground-based, active electronically scanned array, L-band, multi-function long-range 3D radar for air defense surveillance, built by Lockheed Martin.

It is a radar capable of multi-mission operation, and performing simultaneously the following work: air surveillance, low profile UAS detection, ballistic missile search and track, maritime surveillance, and satellite track.

In accordance with the Joint Electronics Type Designation System (JETDS), the "AN/TPY-4" designation represents the 4th design of an Army-Navy electronic device for ground transportable surveillance radar system. The JETDS system also now is used to name all Department of Defense and some NATO electronic systems.

The system comprises:

- Transceive Group (TG), the radar system,
- Processor Group (PG), that has the generator for the radar system and that processes the data of the radar,
- Ancillary Group (AG), the means of transport.

== Operators ==
=== Current operators ===
Norway (11)
In November 2022, the Norwegian Air Force ordered 8 TPY-4 radars for air surveillance missions, with an option for 3 additional radars. The 8 radars are being delivered until 2025. In September 2024, the option for the 3 additional radars was exercised.
The Platform Electronic System is built by Kongsberg Defence & Aerospace (KDA).
United States (19)
The United States Air Force selected this radar for the 3DELRR programme (3-dimensional expeditionary long range radar) in February 2022. The plan is to replace the TPS-75 with 35 AN/TPY-4(V)1 by 2028.
- 2 ordered in April 2022 for USD $75.0 million.
- 4 ordered in February 2023 for USD $84.9 million.
- 3 ordered in January 2024 for USD $65.1 million, to be delivered by end of January 2026.
- 10 ordered in April 2025

=== Future operators ===
Denmark (3)
Ordered in December 2025. At a cost of $610 million, with an option for one additional.
Sweden
Ordered in June 2025.

=== Potential operators ===
Singapore
Lockheed Martin is offering an undisclosed number of the TPY-4 ground-based long-range surveillance radar to the RSAF (Republic of Singapore Air Force) to replace its FPS-117 radar.

== See also ==
- List of radars
- List of military electronics of the United States
- AESA
- TPY-2
