= Combined Air Operations Centre Bodø =

Emblem of the Combined Air Operations Centre Bodø

Combined Air Operations Centre (CAOC) Bodø is a Combined Air Operations Centre located in Bodø, Norway.

The centre oversees air operations in the Nordic region, the Baltic Sea, the North Atlantic and the Barents Sea, over Finland, Norway and Sweden.

== Background ==
As part of the Nordic defence cooperation NORDEFCO, Norwegian Chief of Defence Eirik Kristoffersen proposed in July 2023 the establishment of a regional Combined Air Operations Centre in Northern Europe, with Bodø as the preferred location.

In February 2025, NATO defence ministers decided to establish an air operations centre for the Nordic region, to be based in Norway.Two sites were considered: Underground facilities at Reitan outside Bodø and Rygge Air Force Base.

On 15 May 2025, the Støre cabinet decided that the centre would be temporarily located in Bodø, a decision that was later changed , so that the permanent location also would be at Bodø. The investment costs are estimated at NOK 4.8 billion, and between 200 and 450 personnel will work at the facility.

The centre was opened in October 2025.
