= Hellenic Tactical Air Force Command =

The Hellenic Tactical Air Force Command (Greek: Αρχηγείο Τακτικής Αεροπορίας, ΑΤΑ, "Tactical Air Force Headquarters") is the operational command of the Hellenic Air Force, comprising all combat units and formations of the Hellenic Air Force. It was founded in 1952 and is headquartered in Larissa. The HTAF headquarters is also responsible for Greece's national air defence and the search and rescue operations within the Athens FIR, and has operational control over the air defence units of the Hellenic Army and the Hellenic Navy as well. In addition, it hosts the NATO Combined Air Operations Centre-7 (CAOC-7) which is headquartered in the nearby village of Koutsohero.

== History ==
The HTAF was founded in 1952 by Royal Decree 46/30-4-1952. It was renamed 28th Tactical Air Force Headquarters (28ο Αρχηγείο Τακτικής Αεροπορίας) in 1953, when it was moved to Larissa. It was again renamed to 28th Tactical Air Force Command (28η Τακτική Αεροπορική Διοίκηση) in 1968, to 28th Tactical Air Force (28η Τακτική Αεροπορική Δύναμη) in 1970, to 28th Tactical Air Force Headquarters (28ο Αρχηγείο Τακτικής Αεροπορικής Δύναμης) in 1977. In 1979, the numerical prefix was dropped, and it received to its present name in 1984.
