= Uedem =

- Municipality
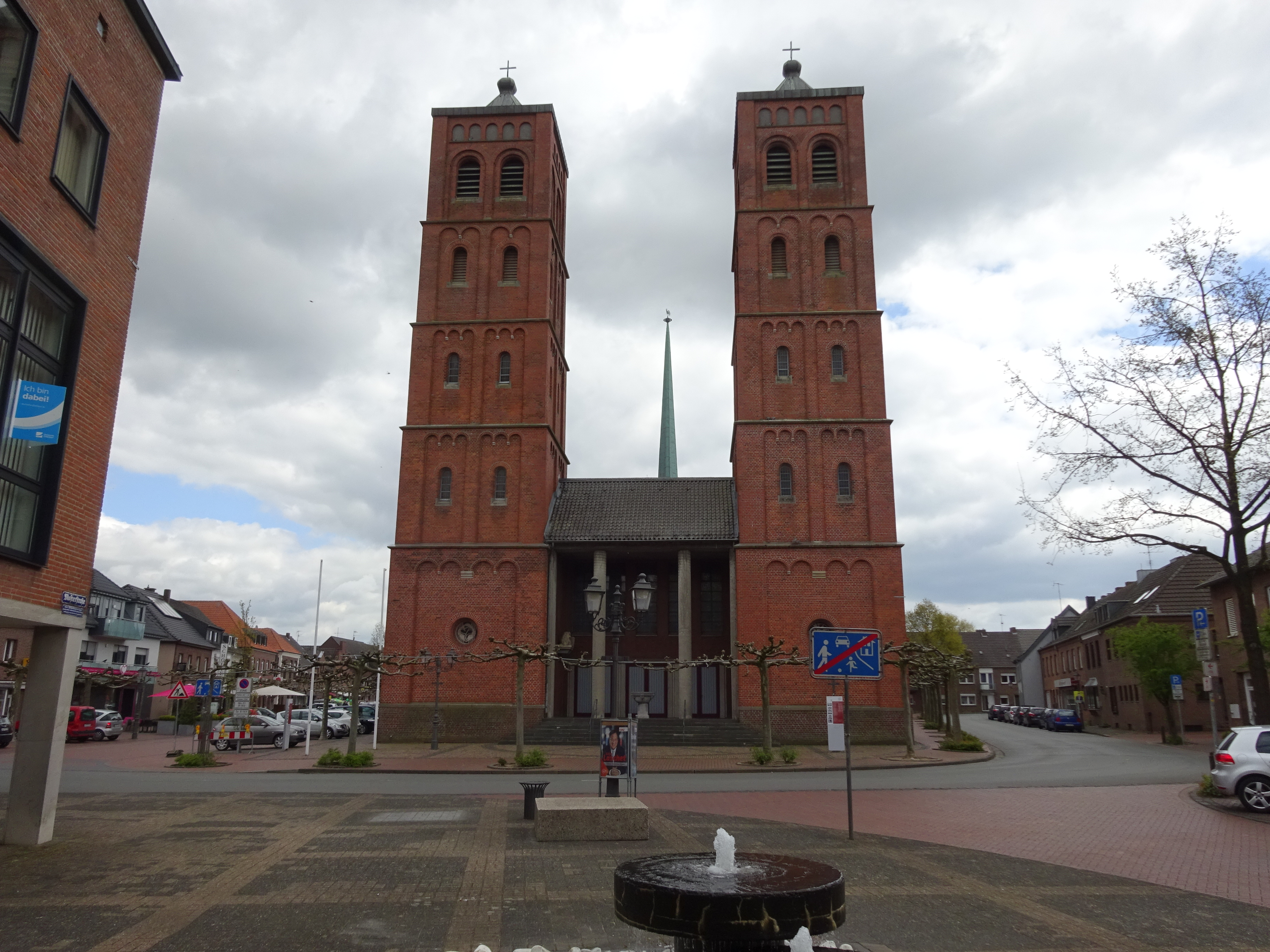

- Flag Coat of arms

- Location of Uedem within Kleve district
- Interactive map of Uedem
- Location within Germany Location within North Rhine-Westphalia
- Coordinates: 51°40′3″N 6°16′30″E
- Country: Germany
- State: North Rhine-Westphalia
- Admin. region: Düsseldorf
- District: Kleve

Government
  - Mayor (2020–25): Rainer Weber (CDU)

Area
  - Total: 60.93 km^{2} (23.53 sq mi)
- Elevation: 21 m (69 ft)

Population (2025-12-31)
  - Total: 8,084
  - Density: 132.7/km^{2} (343.6/sq mi)
- Time zone: UTC+01:00 (CET)
  - Summer (DST): UTC+02:00 (CEST)
- Postal codes: 47589
- Dialling codes: 0 28 25
- Vehicle registration: KLE
- Website: www.uedem.de

Uedem (German pronunciation: [ˈyːdəm]) is a municipality in the district of Cleves, in North Rhine-Westphalia, Germany. It is located near the border with the Netherlands.

== Division of the town ==
Uedem consists of 4 districts

- Uedem
- Uedemerfeld
- Keppeln
- Uedemerbruch

== History ==
The history of Uedem goes back to the 5th century when Frankish nobleman Udo started a settlement in the area. In 866, the first official mention of "Odeheimero Marca" appeared. with Uedem gaining town privileges in 1359.

In November 1614, the Treaty of Xanten was signed in Cleves, dividing some of the territory around Uedem.

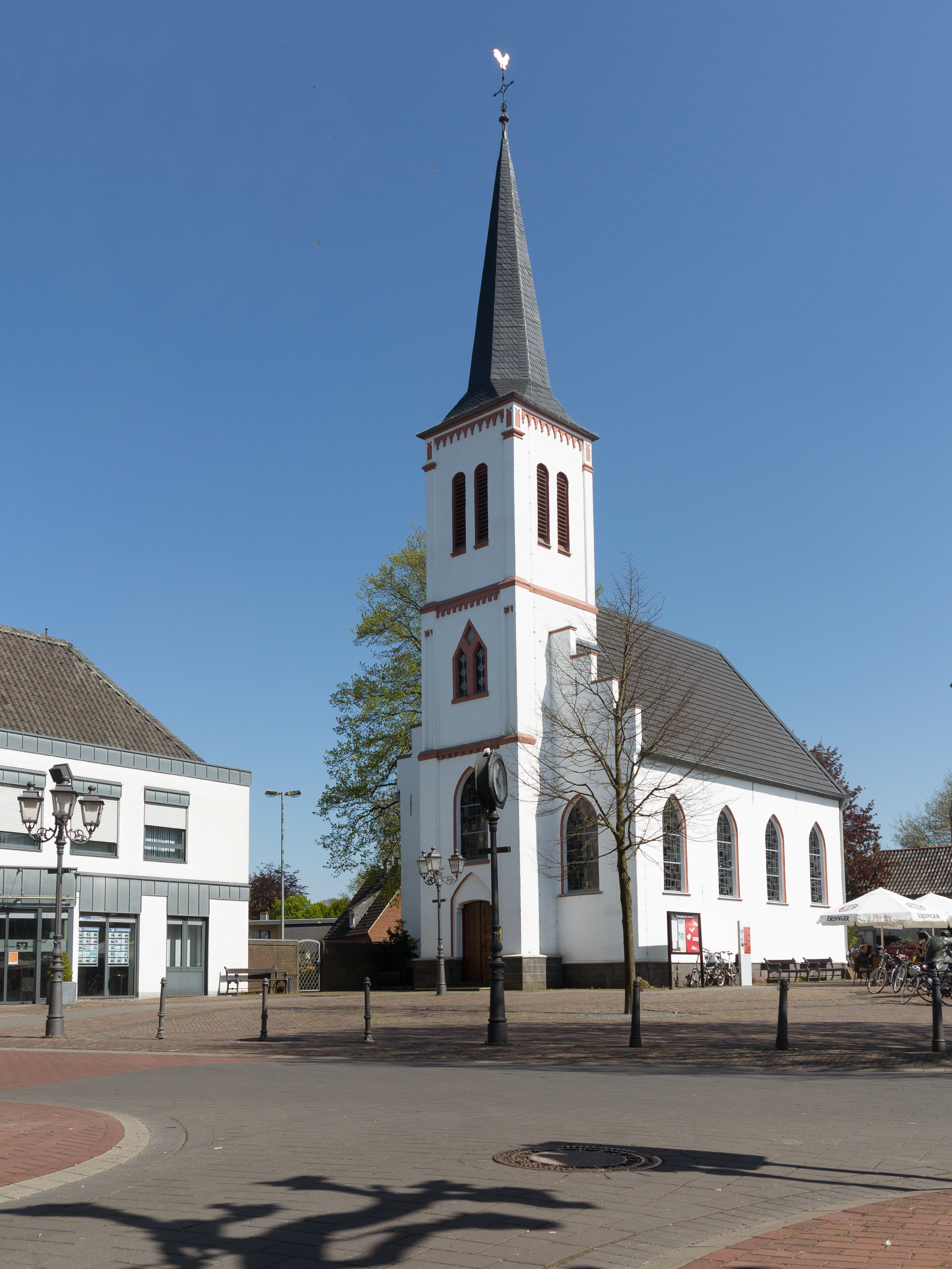
Uedem Reformed Church

From 1794 onwards, the French First Republic occupied the city of Uedem, and in 1798 town privileges were revoked. The occupation ended in 1814 with the First Peace of Paris.

After the Nazi takeover in 1933, Uedem fell under the administrative control of Gau Essen. Bombing during World War II destroyed parts of Uedem, but the city has since recovered. After the war, Uedem became a center for Bundeswehr operations, and since 1993 has hosted the NATO Combined Air Operations Centre Uedem.

== Population ==
Historical population

Year	Pop.	±% p.a.
1965	6,148	—
1970	6,500	+1.12%
1975	6,496	−0.01%
1980	6,397	−0.31%
1985	6,485	+0.27%
1990	6,822	+1.02%
1995	7,733	+2.54%

Year	Pop.	±% p.a.
2000	8,330	+1.50%
2005	8,458	+0.31%
2010	8,218	−0.57%
2015	8,266	+0.12%
2020	8,305	+0.09%
2025	8,084	−0.54%

Source: Landesdatabank Nordrhein-Westfalen

== Notable people ==
- Hermann Gröhe (born 1961), politician (CDU)
