= Alert area =

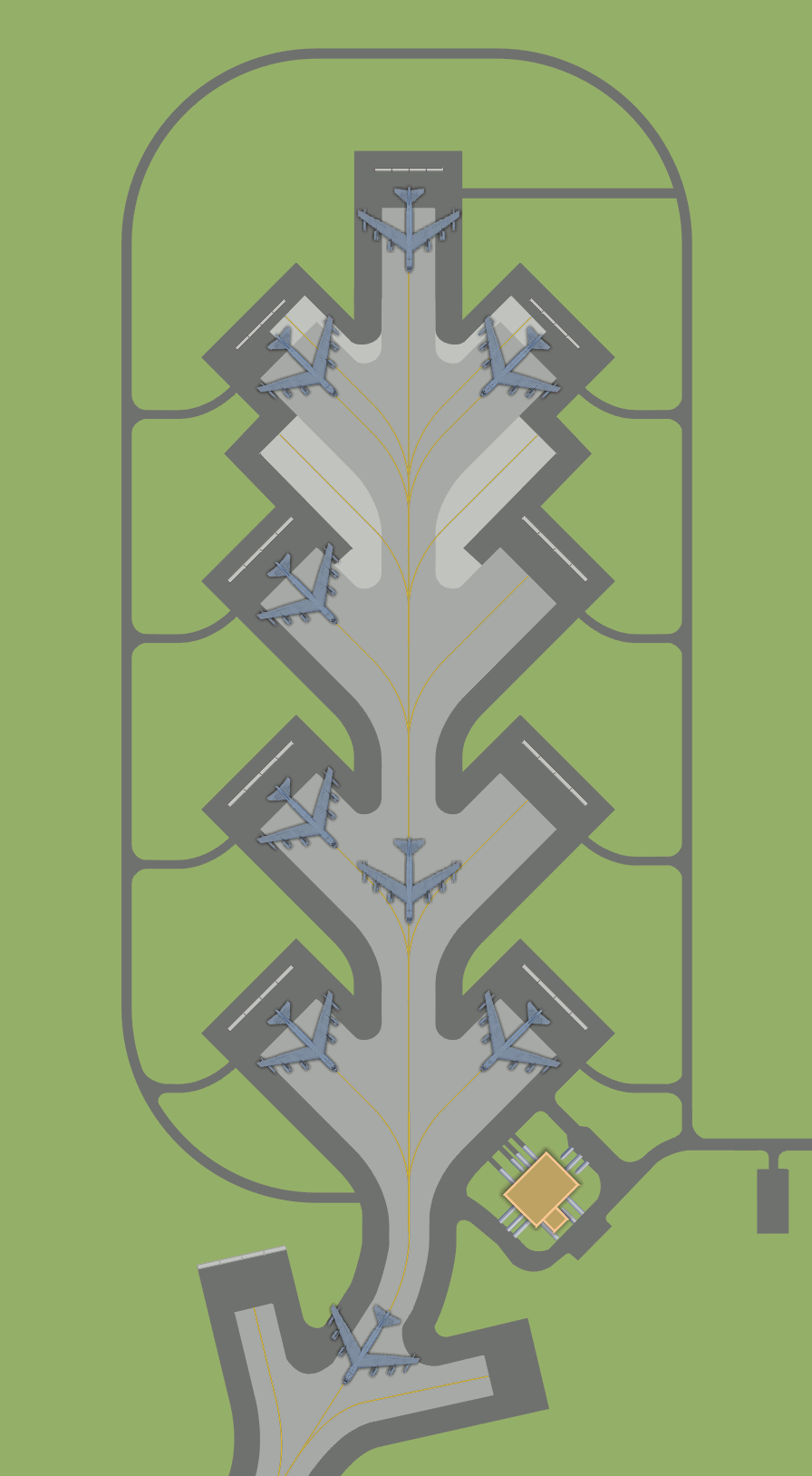
Example drawn from Glasgow Air Force Base, Montana. c.1957-1968. The yellow building is a mole hole, with the grey area being the Christmas tree.

An Alert Area is a place of alert for military aircraft at United States Air Force bases. During the Cold War, bomber aircraft would be stationed on the Christmas trees within the area, ready to take off at moment's notice. Oftentimes, tanker aircraft would be stationed in a separate area of the base, and would take off along with their bomber counterparts. At the Alert Area at Loring Air Force Base, the area consisted of a forty acre high-security area located to the southeast corner of the runway, and bordered to the east by forest. It also contains a Christmas tree and mole hole, among other buildings.
