= Loring Air Force Base Alert Area =

Military area

Coordinates: 46°56′15.55″N 67°52′27.72″W

The Loring Air Force Base Alert Area is a former alert area for B-52 Stratofortress aircraft of the 42d Bombardment Wing situated at the former Loring Air Force Base at Limestone, Maine. It was constructed in 1960 due to a demand by the Strategic Air Command that its bomber bases have a staging area to launch alerts from.

== History ==
The alert force at Loring was established on October 15, 1957. Three months later, the 42d Bombardment Wing began supporting an alert force with six aircraft, later expanding to the entire wing. During the later half of 1958, the alert force was a member of Operation Head Start, the first test in the United States Air Force of sustained airborne alert operations. At or around this time, it was decided to move the alert force to a dedicated location to the southeast of the runway.

From 1960 until 1967, alert forces remained at the new location, until the 1965 submission of Project One Roof was implemented. The submission of this project by base staff consolidated alert functions back under the roof of Building 6000, which had previously hosted the alert forces until the alert area's construction. For the next sixteen years, the alert area would remain vacant until 1983, when a major renovation to the mole hole building allowed for the area to be occupied again. By 1972, the alert force was reduced so that 62% of the bomber and 72% of the tanker force would be on alert. Increased military funding in the early 1980s due to the domestic policies of Ronald Reagan's administration allowed for a wing to be added to the mole hole. This allowed for the building to be reoccupied until the drawdown of forces under the administration of George H. W. Bush in the early 1990s.

== Buildings ==
The alert area is a forty acre high-security area located to the southeast corner of the runway, and bordered to the east by forest. It also contains a Christmas tree and mole hole, among other buildings. Within the alert area, a 1994 survey identified the following buildings facilities as existing: "One Christmas tree apron (Structure No. 540), the Alert Crew Readiness Building (8970), a surveillance and control tower (8990), a Security Police Entry Control Building (8965), an electric power station building (8966), a heating fuel oil storage tank (8967), and tennis courts (14501). A road surrounds the Alert Area just inside the security fence."
