= Mole hole =

Type of building

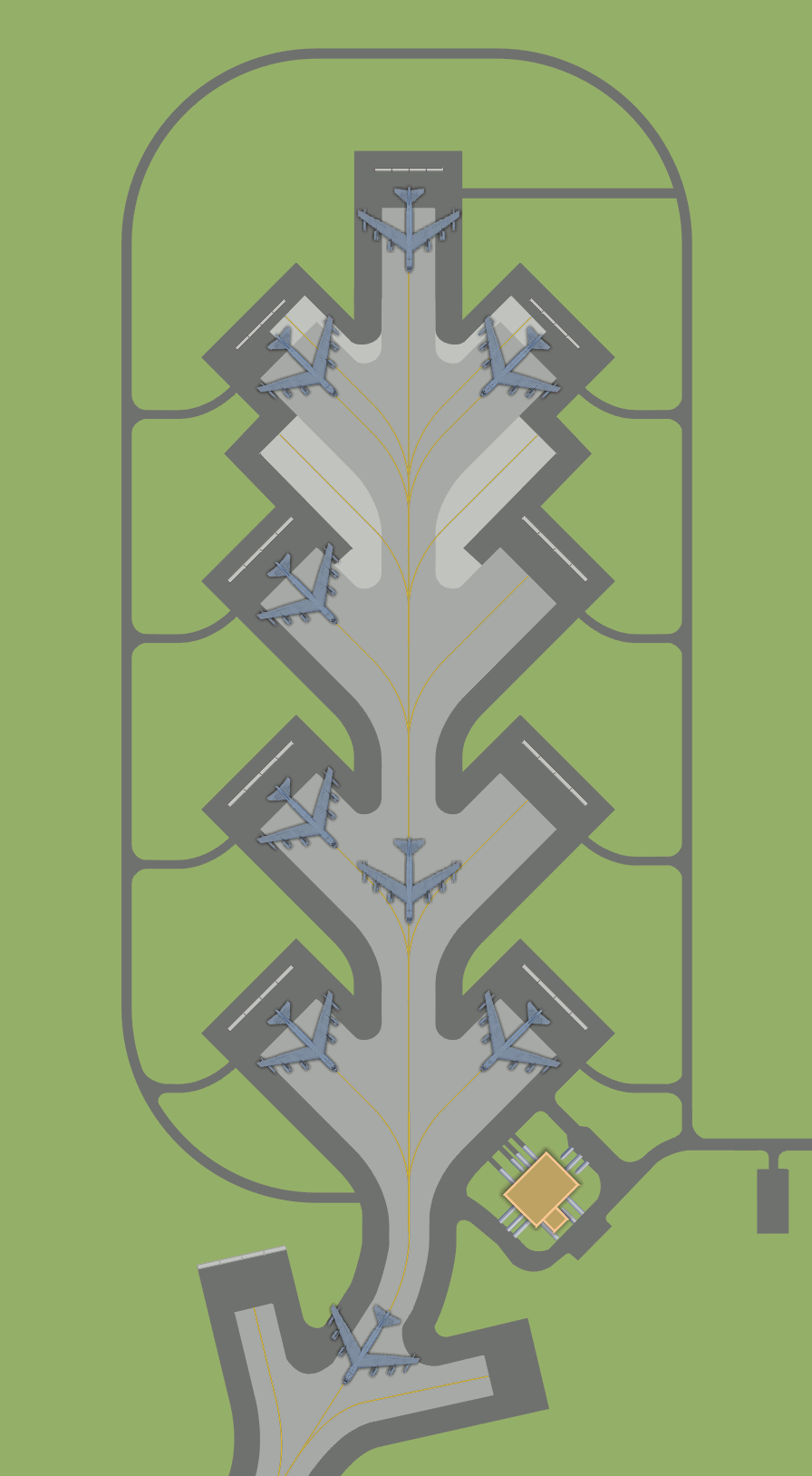
Diagram of the "Christmas Tree" at the former Glasgow Air Force Base, with the mole hole in the lower right-hand corner.

A mole hole, officially designated the Readiness Crew Building (RCB), is a type of structure built by the United States Air Force at former Strategic Air Command (SAC) bases around the country during the 1950s and 1960s. The diagram to the right indicates the positioning of an RCB at the former Glasgow Air Force Base, Montana. Nearly identical facilities were constructed at many other SAC bases of the Cold War period, such as Barksdale Air Force Base, Louisiana; Fairchild Air Force Base, Washington; McConnell Air Force Base, Kansas; Pease Air Force Base, New Hampshire; McCoy Air Force Base, Florida and March Air Force Base, California or bases where SAC was a tenant such as Robins Air Force Base, Georgia and Mather Air Force Base, California.

RCBs were located adjacent to an Alert Ramp, also called a "Christmas Tree", where Ready Alert bomber and aerial refueling (also known as "tanker") aircraft were parked. These aircraft were initially Boeing B-47 Stratojet aircraft armed with nuclear weapons, augmented by Boeing KC-97 Stratofreighter aerial refueling aircraft. As SAC introduced newer bomber and aerial tanker aircraft into its inventory, the B-47 and KC-97 were later superseded by Boeing B-52 Stratofortress, Convair B-58 Hustler, General Dynamics FB-111 or Rockwell B-1 Lancer bombers, augmented by Boeing KC-135 Stratotanker or McDonnell Douglas KC-10 Extender aerial refueling aircraft.

== History ==
Due to aircraft being parked at the "Christmas Tree" being on constant alert duty, the Strategic Air Command realized that they needed specialized buildings to house crews who rotated on alert duty. In 1958, Leo A Daly, an architect from Omaha, Nebraska, was hired to design buildings that would respectively hold 70, 100, and 150 men. These standardized structures would eventually be nicknamed "mole holes" due to the fact that the men would run out onto the "Christmas Tree" through corrugated steel tunnels attached to the lower level of the building when the alert Klaxon sounded. The buildings would house readiness crews and contained thick concrete exteriors, bathrooms, a briefing room for crew members, dormitories, several classrooms, a kitchen and a dining facility. Since crews were typically assigned on alert for seven-day periods, some installations would later incorporate outdoor athletic facilities on site, such as baseball fields and/or swimming pools, as well as picnic facilities where families could visit crewmembers on duty.

Crews on alert duty would typically be on alert for seven days out of a 21-day period, while being on rotational alert duty. During their alert duty, they would fly no training missions, as they were to be kept always ready for an operational launch in the event of a nuclear strike.

During an alert scramble, flight crews and ground crews would run out to the "Christmas Tree", where they would travel on foot and/or by waiting alert vehicles to the alert bomber and tanker aircraft that were waiting to launch, typically between four and nine in number. Once all engines were started, the aircraft would perform an elephant walk to the runway, where a Minimum Interval Takeoff (MITO) might be performed.

Over the course of their construction, eleven facilities to house 150 people were built. These were supplemented by an additional ten facilities for housing 100 men, and 45 facilities for housing 70 men at a total of 65 SAC bases, other USAF bases where a SAC wing was a tenant command, and Royal Canadian Air Force and Royal Canadian Navy bases where a SAC wing was present. The facilities replaced various facilities that housed crew members earlier, including house trailers, which sat next to the aircraft.

== Locations ==
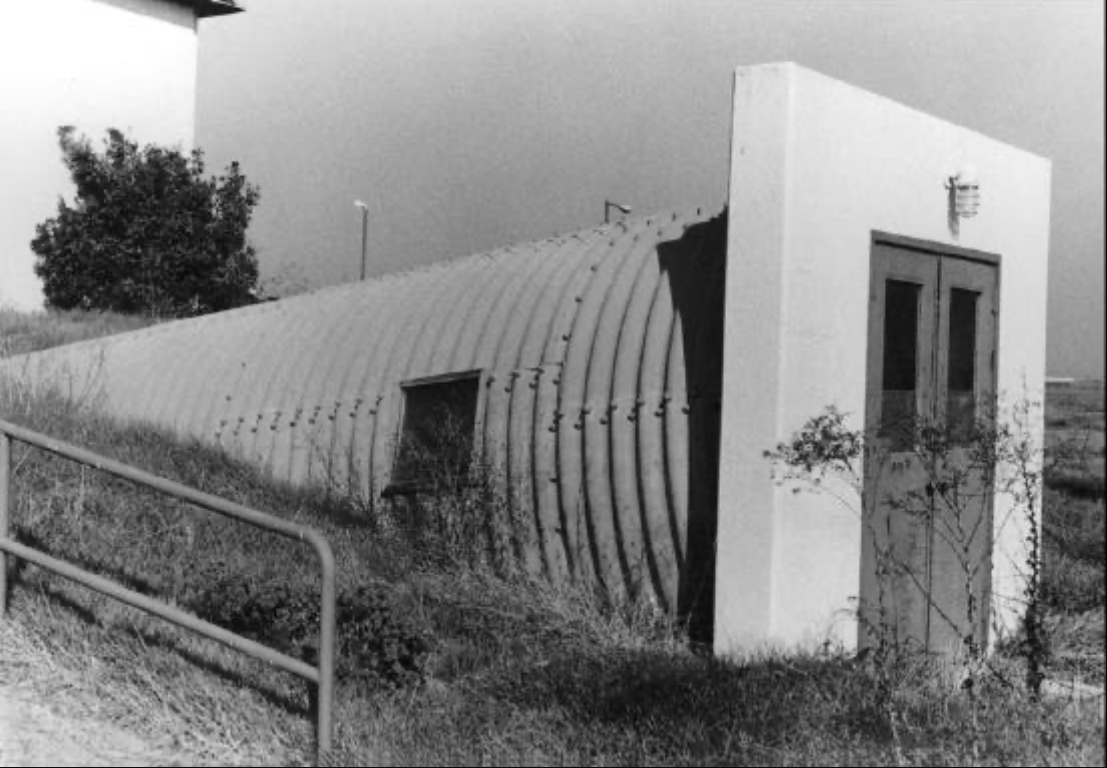
This photograph from the US Army Corps of Engineers shows the "molehole" corrugated steel tunnel attached to the housing complex.

Readiness Crew Buildings designed to accommodate 150 Airmen were located at the following Air Force Bases:

- Bunker Hill AFB, later Grissom AFB (Indiana)
- Forbes AFB (Kansas)
- Hunter AFB (Georgia)
- Lincoln AFB (Nebraska)
- Lockbourne AFB, later Rickenbacker AFB (Ohio)

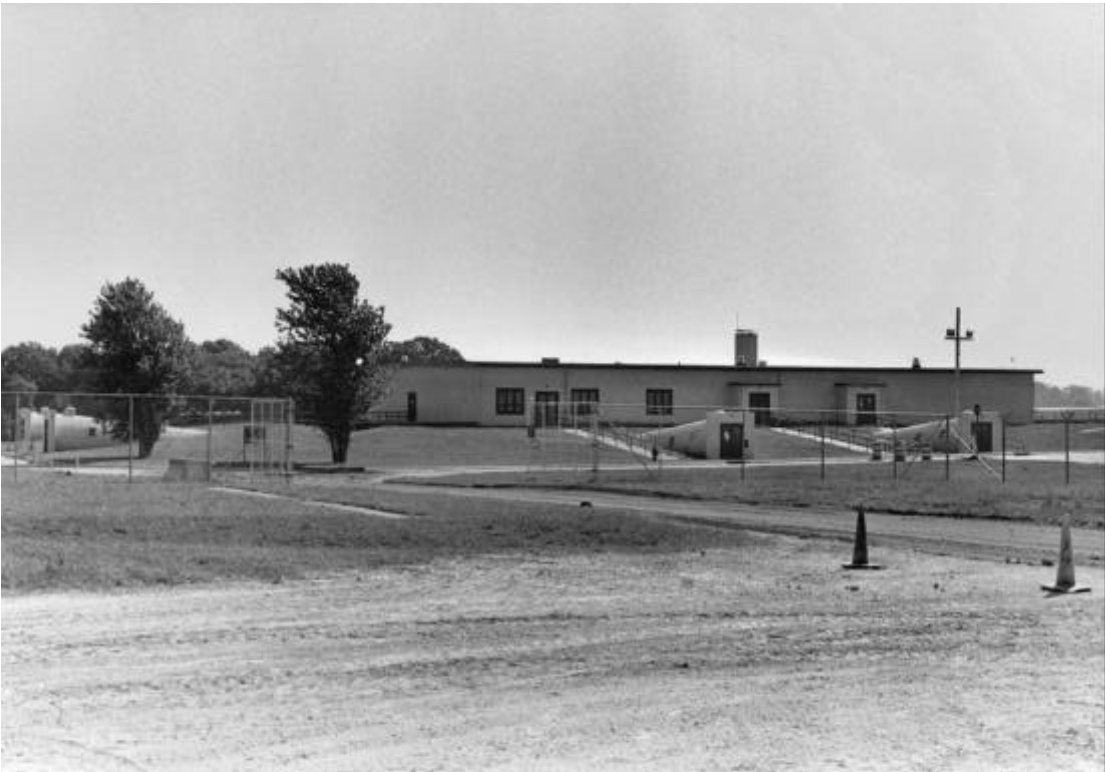
This photograph is an example of a 150-man molehole located at Whiteman Air Force Base in Missouri. Notice the corrugated steel tunnels that appear on the front and the side of the building, allowing for rapid egress in the event of an alert.

- Malmstrom AFB (Montana)
- Mountain Home AFB (Idaho)
- Pease AFB (New Hampshire)
- Plattsburgh AFB (New York)
- Richard I. Bong AFB (Wisconsin) (planned, never completed)
- Whiteman AFB (Missouri)

Readiness Crew Buildings designed to accommodate 100 Airmen were located at the following Air Force Bases:

- Chennault AFB (Louisiana)
- Clinton County AFB (Ohio)
- Davis-Monthan AFB (Arizona)
- Dyess AFB (Texas)
- Homestead AFB (Florida)
- Little Rock AFB (Arkansas)
- MacDill AFB (Florida)
- March AFB (California)
- McCoy AFB (Florida)
- Selfridge AFB (Michigan)
- Ernest Harmon AFB (Newfoundland, Canada)

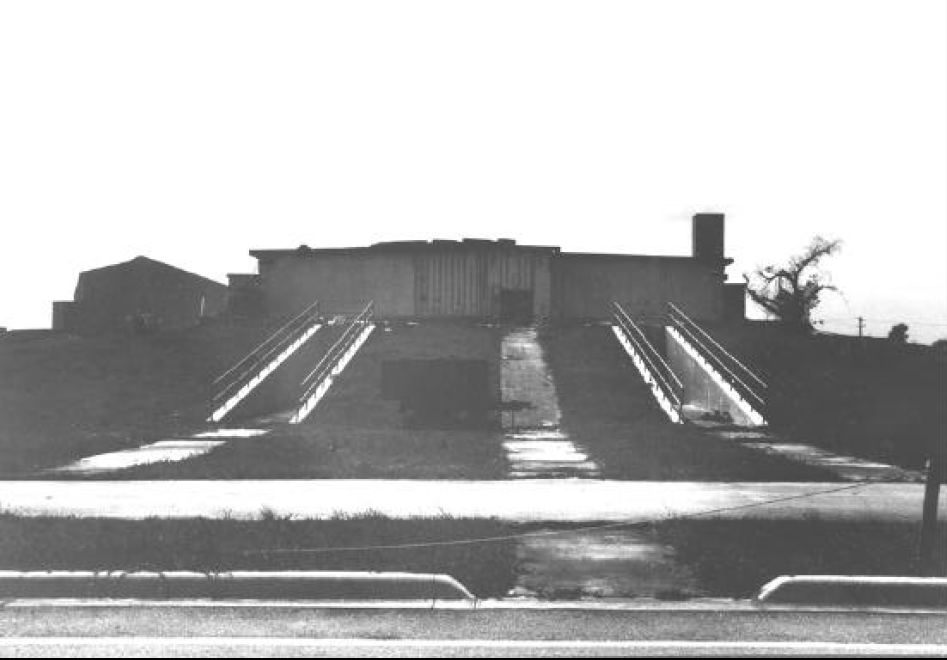
Not all RCBs utilized the corrugated steel tunnels that provided the generic slang name for the housing unit. This example, from Homestead Air Force Base, shows that in some cases, external factors forced the Army Corps of Engineers to modify their plans to accommodate for local restrictions. In the case of this RBC, the building was built entirely above ground, and then the main floor was protected with an earthen berm. The first floor exits, rather than being tunneled, were simply concrete trenches.

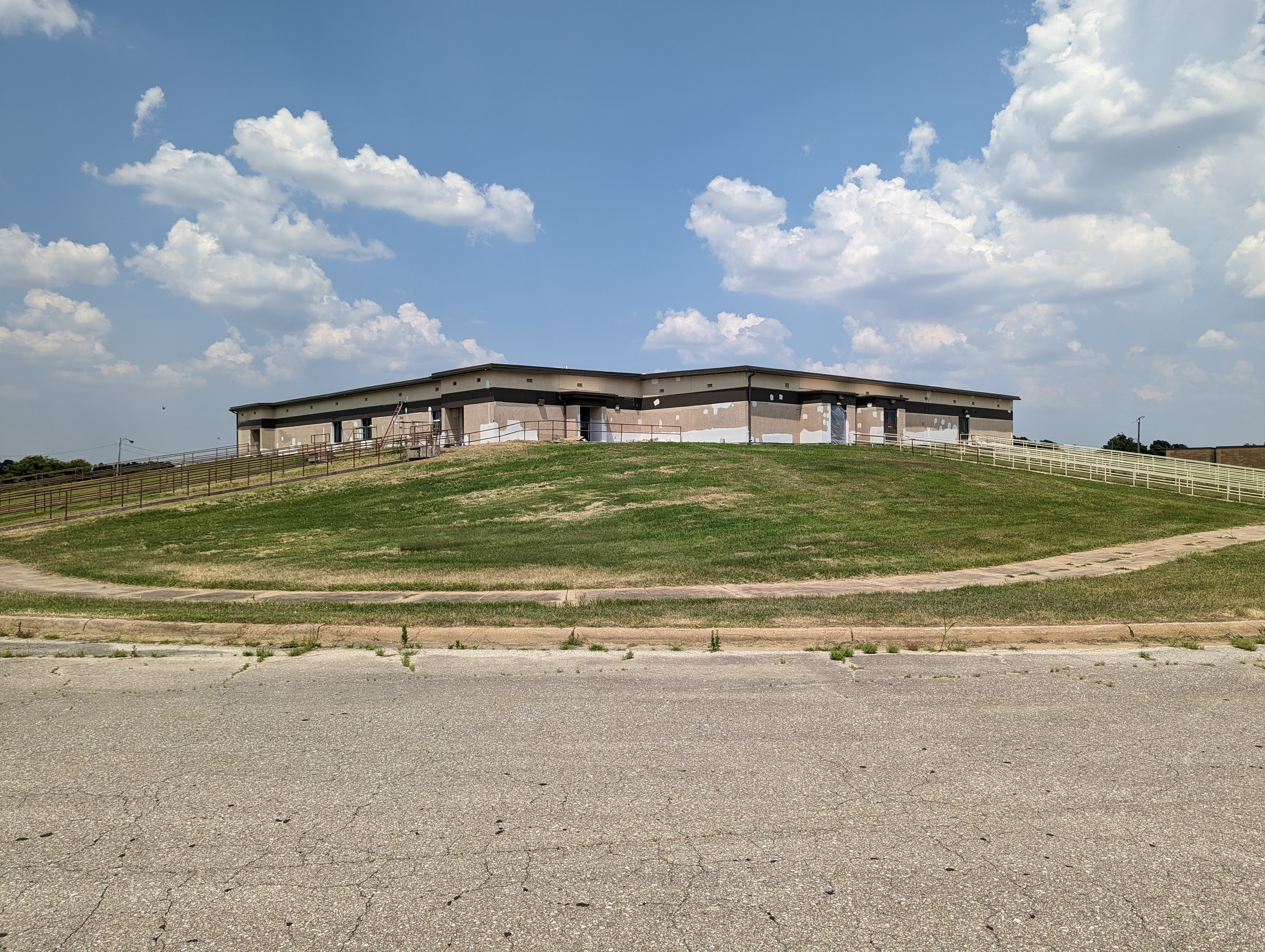
Building 1225, the Readiness Crew Building at Blytheville AFB

Readiness Crew Buildings designed to accommodate 70 Airmen were located at the following Air Force Bases:

- Altus AFB (Oklahoma)
- Amarillo AFB (Texas)
- Barksdale AFB (Louisiana)
- Beale AFB (California)
- Bergstrom AFB (Texas)
- Biggs AFB (Texas)
- Blytheville AFB (Arkansas)
- Carswell AFB (Texas)
- Castle AFB (California)
- Clinton-Sherman AFB (Oklahoma)
- Columbus AFB (Mississippi)
- Dow AFB (Maine)
- Dover AFB (Delaware)
- Eglin AFB (Florida)
- Ellsworth AFB (South Dakota)
- Fairchild AFB (Washington)
- Glasgow AFB (Montana)
- Grand Forks AFB (North Dakota)
- Griffiss AFB (New York)
- Kinross AFB, later Kincheloe AFB (Michigan)
- K.I. Sawyer AFB (Michigan)
- Larson AFB (Washington)
- Loring AFB (Maine)
- Mather AFB (California)
- McChord AFB (Washington)
- McGuire AFB (New Jersey)
- Minot AFB (North Dakota)
- Otis AFB (Massachusetts)
- Ramey AFB (Puerto Rico)
- Robins AFB (Georgia)
- Schilling AFB (Kansas)
- Seymour Johnson AFB (North Carolina)
- Sheppard AFB (Texas)
- Travis AFB (California)
- Turner AFB (Georgia)
- Walker AFB (New Mexico)
- Westover AFB (Massachusetts)
- Wright-Patterson AFB (Ohio)
- Wurtsmith AFB (Michigan)

In addition to the United States Air Force bases listed above, Readiness Crew Buildings designed to accommodate 70 Airmen were also operated at the following Royal Canadian Air Force and Royal Canadian Navy bases:

- Goose Bay AB (Labrador, Canada)
- RCAF Station Cold Lake (Alberta, Canada)
- HMCS Churchill (Manitoba, Canada)
- RCAF Station Namao (Alberta, Canada)
- RCAF Station Frobisher Bay (Nunavut, Canada)
