= Interception procedure =

Procedure to intercept civilian aircraft

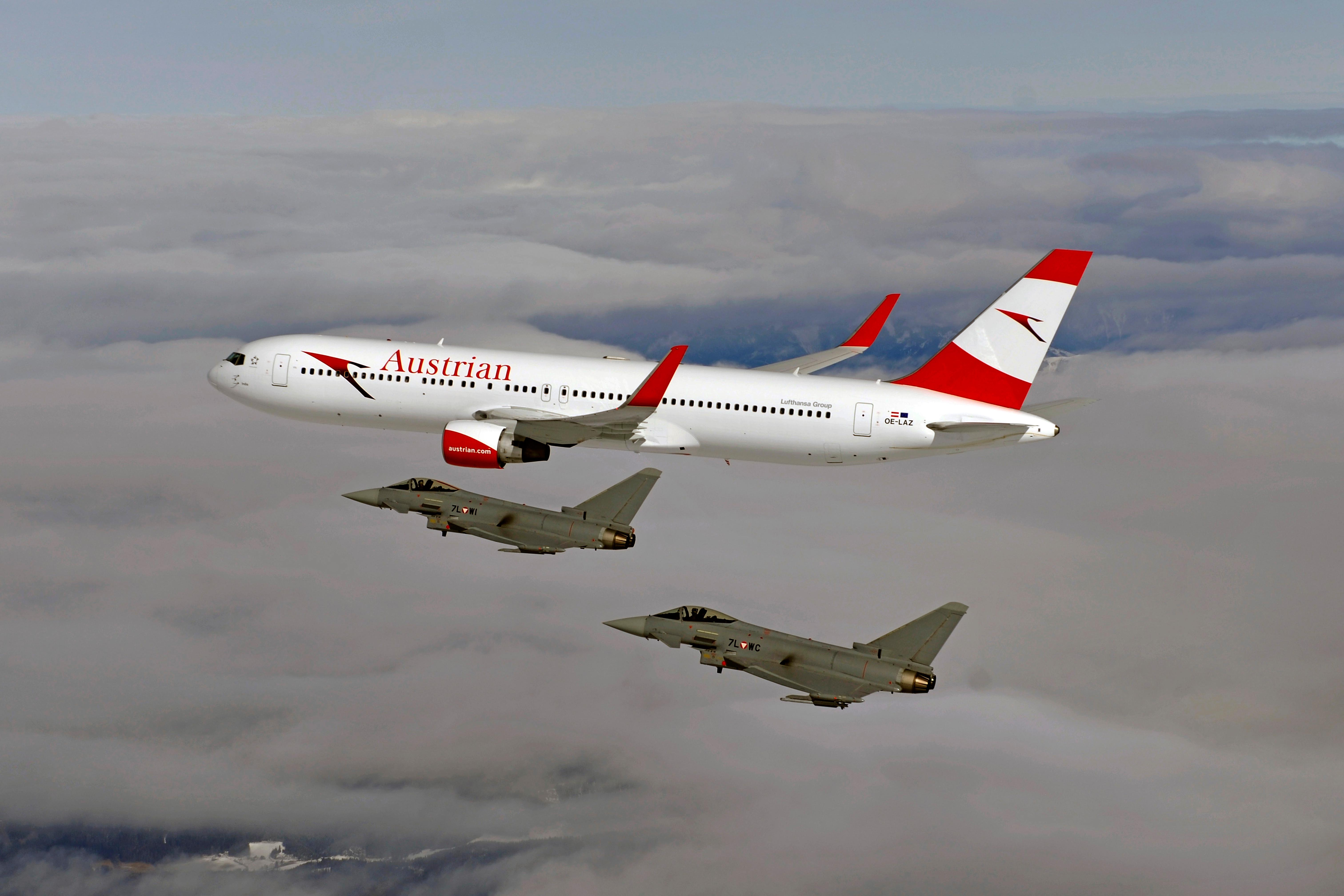
A passenger aircraft Boeing 767 being intercepted by Eurofighter Typhoon fighters from Austrian Armed Forces during an interception training

Interception procedures or intercept procedures are aviation procedures used to intercept civilian aircraft in flight for defense or emergency reasons. Interceptor aircraft may approach, identify, and guide the target aircraft before flying away.

== Purpose ==
The purpose of interception includes identify, track, inspect, divert, and establish communication with the target aircraft, in the interest of national security or defense. This includes aircraft flying into Air Defense Identification Zone or restricted airspaces without proper arrangements. Other reasons may include assisting an aircraft in emergency.

== Phases ==
Phases during an intercept: 1. Interceptor aircraft (green) approach and identify the target aircraft (red).; 2. Interceptor aircraft guide the target aircraft to divert.; 3. Interceptor aircraft break away from the target aircraft.

=== Approach phase ===
Interceptor aircraft will close in on the target while maintaining safe separation at all times. When fighter aircraft conduct the intercept, they typically approach from behind the target and operate in pairs, with one fighter flies to the left side to sight the pilot of the target aircraft. If the interceptor aircraft is a helicopter, it may approach from any direction. Interceptors will rock their wings to signal to the target aircraft that it's been intercepted, and the target aircraft is expected to rock its wing back for acknowledgement. Navigation lights are flashed at irregular intervals during night time for greater visibility. The intercepted pilots should try to establish radio communication on 121.5 MHz and squawk 7700 if equipped with a transponder.

=== Identification phase ===
According to the United States Federal Aviation Administration, interceptor aircraft should maneuver closer "to establish positive identification and to gather the necessary information" from the target aircraft while maintaining necessary distance consistent with the aircraft performance. Fighter aircraft may fly past the target aircraft at this phase. Helicopter interceptors typically fly slightly ahead and to the left of the target aircraft in the formation.

=== Post-intercept phase ===
==== Divert ====
The interceptor aircraft will try to escort the target aircraft to an expected direction by crossing the target's flight path and lead to the desired direction. If the target aircraft does not comply, a second attempt will be made with flares as warning signals. An interceptor helicopter may use visual signaling devices, such as LED scrolling signboards or blue flashing lights, to communicate with its target.

==== Overfly ====
Interceptors can instruct their target aircraft to land at an airport by overflying the runway or the helipad. The target aircraft is expected to lower its landing gear (if equipped) and land. If the target aircraft considers the airport to be inadequate, it is expected to raise its landing gear and continue to circle around the airport, waiting for further instructions.

==== Break-away ====
Once the target aircraft's intention is understood, the interceptors will initiate a break-away maneuver, which involves an abrupt climbing turn of at least 90° without crossing the target's flight path. If unable to comply, the target aircraft is expected to flash all available lights at regular intervals. And if in an emergency, the target aircraft is expected to flash all available lights at irregular intervals.

=== Non-compliance ===
Noncompliance from the target aircraft may result in the use of force.

== Legality ==
In Convention on International Civil Aviation Annex 2 Rules of the Air, the International Civil Aviation Organization (ICAO) mandates its member states to issue "appropriate regulations and administrative directives" regarding aircraft interception and ensure the safety of intercepted civil aircraft, using interception only as a last resort. ICAO also urges its member state to adopt its published interception signals that are meant to be internationally and uniformly recognized. Intercepted pilots are obligated to comply with the rules set by the state upon observing or receiving interception signals.

== See also ==
- Index of aviation articles
- List of established military terms
- Scrambling (military)
- Quick Reaction Alert
- Combat readiness
- Minimum Interval Takeoff
- Interceptor aircraft
- Ground-controlled interception
- Point defense
