= Volkel Air Base =

Military airport in North Brabant, Netherlands

Volkel Air Base
- Vliegbasis Volkel
- Near Volkel in Netherlands
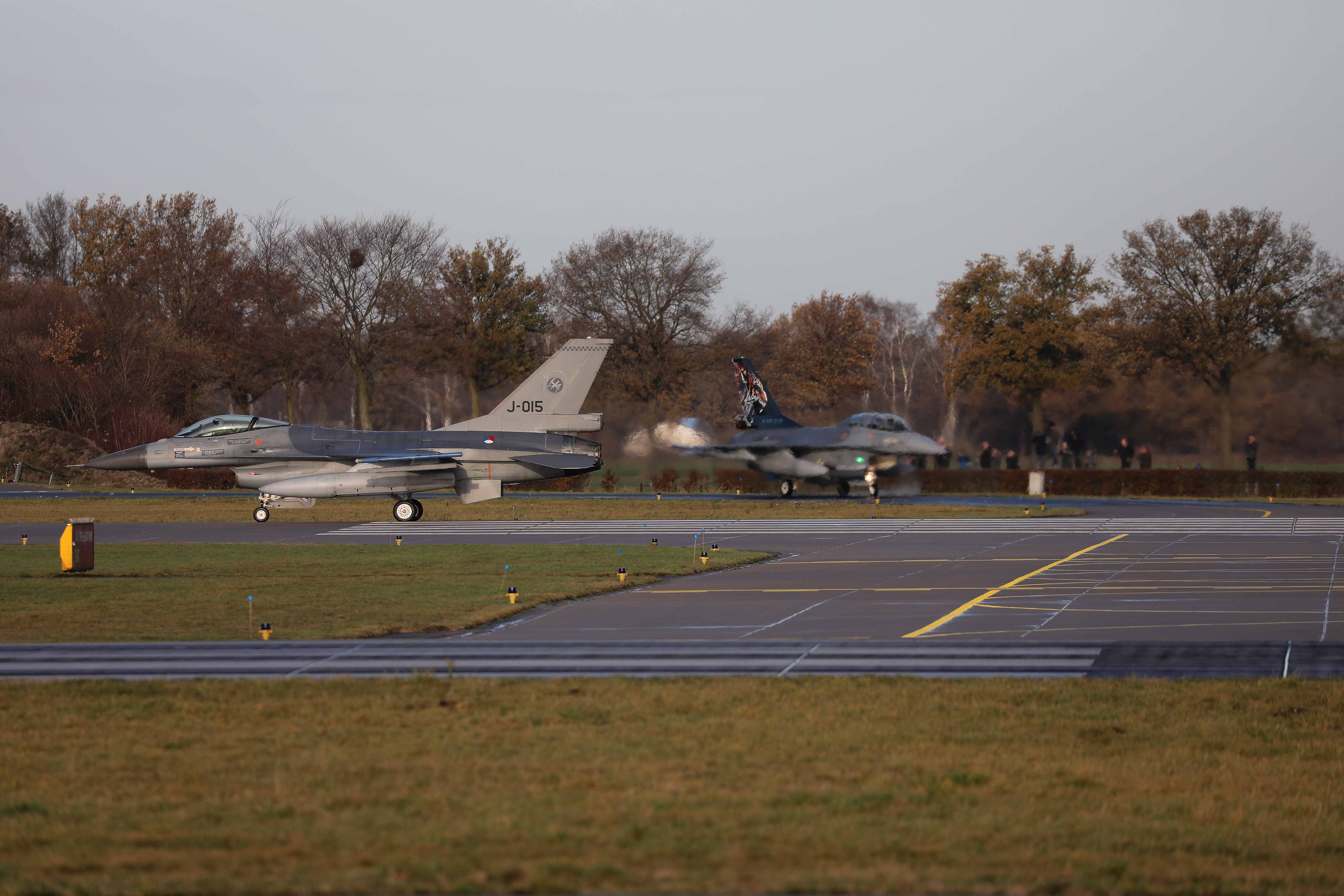
- A Royal Netherlands Air Force F-16 Fighting Falcon at Volkel Air Base

- Motto Gestaag gespannen (Dutch for 'Steadily tense')

Site information
- Type: Military airfield
- Owner: Ministry of Defence
- Operator: Royal Netherlands Air and Space Force (RNLASF)
- Condition: Operational
- Website: Official website (Dutch)

Location
- Location in the Netherlands
- Coordinates: 51°39′26″N 005°41′27″E

Site history
- Built: 1940
- In use: 1940 – present

Airfield information
- Identifiers: IATA: UDE, ICAO: EHVK, WMO: 063750
- Elevation: 22.2 metres (73 ft) AMSL
Runways
Direction	Length and surface
06L/24R	3,029 metres (9,938 ft) Asphalt
06R/24L	2,886 metres (9,469 ft) Asphalt
- Source: Military Aeronautical Information Publication Netherlands

Volkel Air Base (Dutch: Vliegbasis Volkel) (IATA: UDE, ICAO: EHVK) is a military airbase used by the Royal Netherlands Air and Space Force (RNLASF) - Dutch: Koninklijke Luchtmacht (KLu), located near the village of Volkel, Netherlands. Located in the north-east corner of the province of North Brabant, the air base is home to two F-35A squadrons, No. 312 and No. 313 and a maintenance, logistical, base squadron for the RNLASF.

Volkel also houses the 703rd Munitions Support Squadron, part of the 52nd Fighter Wing from the United States Air Force. After more than 50 years, former Prime Minister Ruud Lubbers in 2013 officially confirmed the presence of 22 B61 nuclear bombs at Volkel. In 2021 training with the latest B-61-12 modification began and in December 2023, 14 F-16 could be seen performing an elephant walk (aeronautics) before take off.

== Description ==
Volkel Air Base is located near the village of Volkel. It is one of several military airfields in the Netherlands, and one of the three major operational bases of the Royal Netherlands Air and Space Force (RNLASF), the other two being Leeuwarden Air Base and Gilze-Rijen Air Base. Together with these, it hosts the public viewing days of the RNLASF, held annually at one of these three airfields, having both an airshow and static display of various military and civilian aircraft.

The airport has two parallel runways, both in the 06/24 direction, and both being just over 3,020 metres (9,900 ft) long. 06L/24R is 45 m (148 ft) wide, and is capable of handling larger aircraft. It is also equipped with an instrument landing system (ILS). 06R/24L is narrower at only 23 m (75 ft) wide.

Besides military use, a trauma helicopter operated by ANWB Medical Air Assistance on behalf of the Radboud University Nijmegen Medical Centre is based here. The Dienst Luchtvaart Politie also makes use of Volkel Air Base.

== History ==
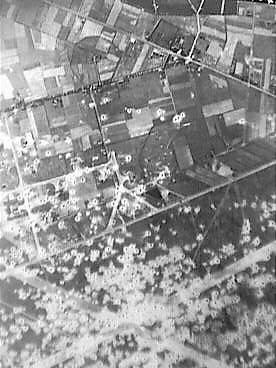
Fliegerhorst Volkel as seen from above in 1944 after having been bombed by allied forces

After the occupation of the Netherlands by Nazi Germany in 1940, the Luftwaffe constructed a diversion airfield for night-fighter aircraft called Nachtlandeplatz Volkel. In 1943, the airfield was expanded into an operational Luftwaffe base, and renamed Fliegerhorst Volkel. It was home to III./NJG 2 operating Junkers Ju 88 night fighters, and II & III./JG 3 operating the Messerschmitt Bf 109G. The last German aircraft based at Volkel were jet-engined Me 262 fighters and Ar 234 reconnaissance bombers. To defend the airfield against aerial attacks, the Germans installed flak guns, but it was still bombed extensively. Attacks in 1944 in support of Operation Market Garden caused such extensive damage to the airfield that it could no longer be used by the Luftwaffe.

When the south of the Netherlands was liberated later that year, the British Royal Air Force (RAF) took control of the airfield. Though the Germans had destroyed most of the remaining airport facilities, the RAF continued to use the airport for the remainder of the war, operating Hawker Typhoon and Hawker Tempest aircraft from Volkel in support of the allied advance into Germany. French ace Pierre Clostermann, at the time a flight commander in No. 122 Wing RAF, provides a detailed description of operations from Volkel in early 1945 in his book The Big Show.

The Dutch Naval Aviation Service started flying from Volkel in 1949 for training purposes. In 1950, the Royal Netherlands Air Force took control of the airfield, restoring it to an operational fighter airfield. Gloster Meteor aircraft were the first jet aircraft to be based at Volkel for the RNLAF. Later came the Lockheed T-33, Republic F-84 Thunderjet and Thunderstreak, which were eventually replaced by the Lockheed F-104 Starfighter, the first supersonic aircraft of the RNLAF. In the 1970s, airport facilities were improved, and 32 protective Hardened Aircraft Shelters (HAS) were constructed for the aircraft. Between 1982 and 1984, the Starfighters were slowly replaced by the F-16 Fighting Falcons that are situated at Volkel, which were manufactured under licence by Fokker. The F-16 jets have been replaced by the Lockheed Martin F-35 Lightning II.

In September 2012, a third squadron No 311 Sqn, was officially disbanded.

== Nuclear weapons ==
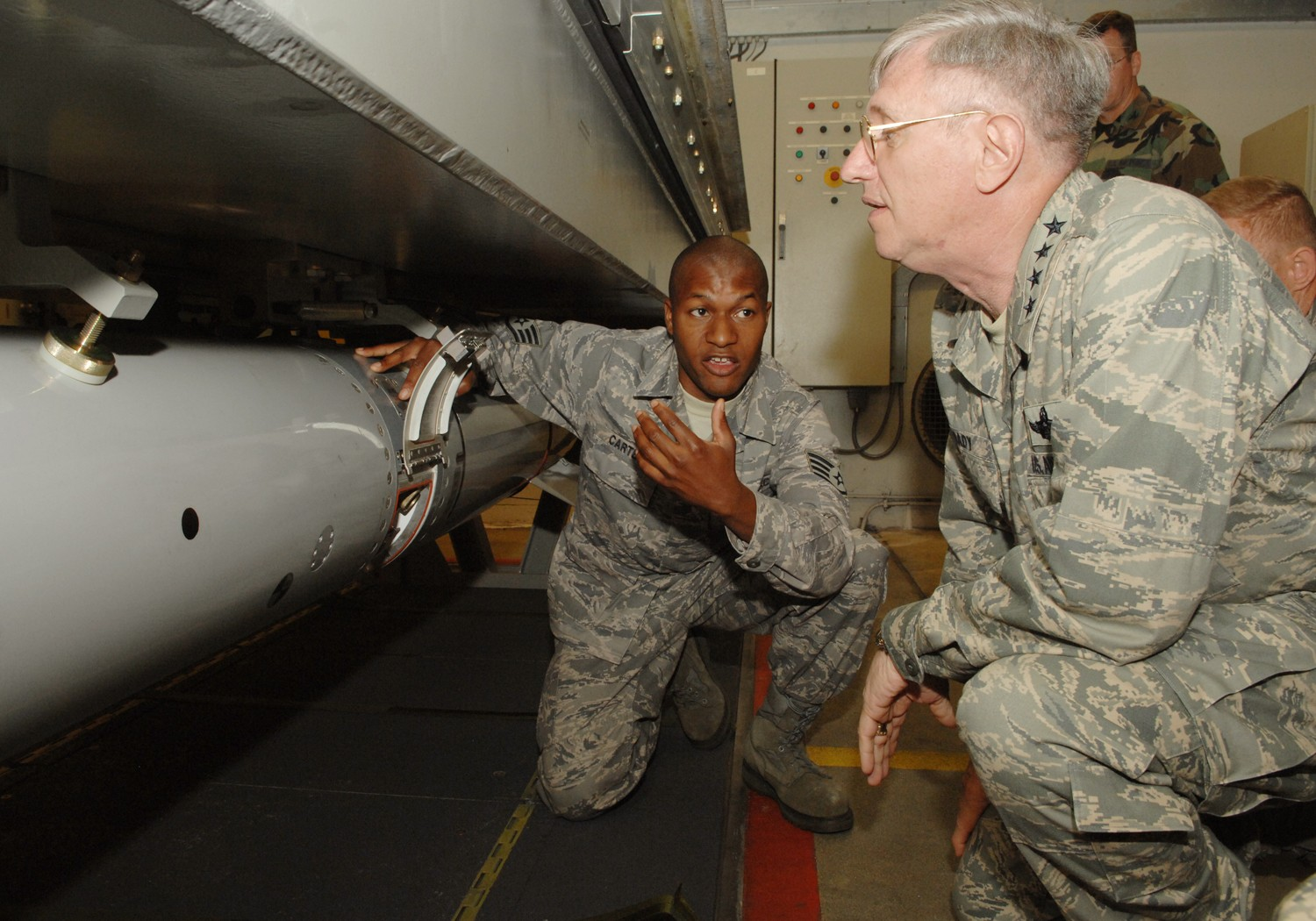
Demonstration of a B61 nuclear bomb disarming procedure on a “dummy” in an underground Weapons Security and Storage System (WS3) vault at Volkel Air Base

As of 2023, Volkel is one of six active air bases in five European countries with B61 nuclear bombs in underground WS3 Weapon Storage and Security System inside aircraft shelters; Ramstein Air Base has a vault but no nuclear weapons present and RAF Lakenheath's bunkers were being modernized.

It is believed that since the early 1960s, USAF nuclear weapons have been stored at Volkel Air Base, to be used by the host nation's aircraft. Formerly, storage took place in a weapon storage area on the north side of the base, and in a heavily defended quick reaction alert (QRA) area; however, since 1991, eleven Weapons Storage and Security Systems (WS3) vaults have been operational in the floors of the aircraft shelters. The USAF 703rd Munitions Support Squadron (703rd MUNSS) has been in charge of maintaining and securing the weapons. As of 2005, the Dutch Ministry of Defence had not officially acknowledged or denied the presence of nuclear weapons at Volkel.

As of 2008, 22 B61 nuclear bombs were stored at Volkel, to be used by the Dutch 311 and 312 F-16 squadrons at the base. The F-16s based at Volkel can at times be seen with BDU-38 dummy bombs, which are used to simulate the B61. In a book published by former air force pilot Steve Netto it is revealed that some fifty B28 nuclear bombs were in storage there around the time of the Cuban Missile Crisis, which if needed were to be deployed by aircraft of the Royal Netherlands Air Force. In a document leaked as a part of the 2010 United States diplomatic cables leak the presence of nuclear weapons in the Netherlands was confirmed, though no specific location was given. On 10 June 2013, former Prime Minister Ruud Lubbers confirmed the existence of 22 nuclear weapons at the airfield. In a 2019 NATO draft report, Volkel was mentioned as one of six locations where, altogether, approximately 150 American B61 bombs are stored.

According to a May 2021 article from Bellingcat, many sensitive security details about the nuclear arsenal at Volkel, such as which vaults had nuclear weapons in them, were inadvertently exposed when journalists discovered that the soldiers tasked with overseeing these weapons had been using publicly available flashcard websites to assist them in learning these details.

In 2021, training with the new U.S. B61-12 bomb carried by the F-16 fighter began, per a video from Sandia National Laboratories. In December 2023, fourteen F-16s could be seen performing an elephant walk before take off.

== Based units ==
Units based at Volkel.

=== Royal Netherlands Air and Space Force ===
- No. 312 Strike Squadron – F-35A
- No. 313 Tiger Squadron – F-35A
- No. 640 Squadron – Base operations
- No. 901 Squadron – Logistics
- Tactical Air Reconnaissance Center (TARC)

=== United States Air Force ===
US Air Forces in Europe - Air Forces Africa (USAFE-AFAFRICA)

- Third Air Force
  - 52nd Fighter Wing
    - 52nd Munitions Maintenance Group
      - 703rd Munition Support Squadron

== See also ==
Air bases with US nuclear weapon vaults in Europe:

- Aviano Air Base, Italy
- Ghedi Air Base, Italy
- Büchel Air Base, Germany
- Kleine Brogel Air Base, Belgium
- Ramstein Air Base, Germany
- RAF Lakenheath, England, United Kingdom
- Araxos Air Base, Greece
- Balikesir Air Base, Turkey
- Incirlik Air Base, Turkey
- Akıncı Air Base, Turkey
