= Volkel =

Settlement in the Netherlands

- Village
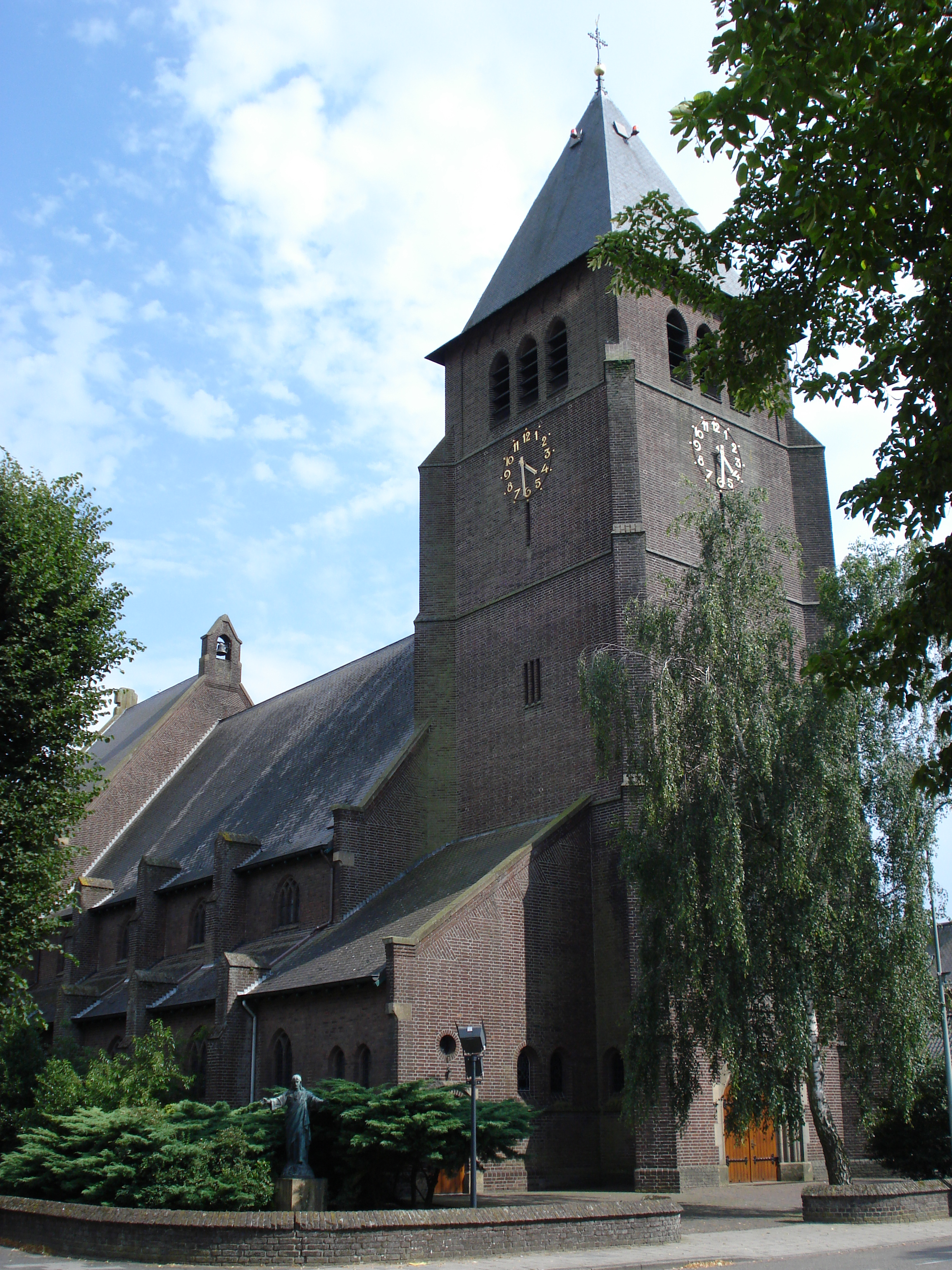
- Church of St. Anthony

- Location in the province of North Brabant in the Netherlands Volkel (Netherlands)
- Coordinates: 51°38′40″N 5°39′10″E
- Country: Netherlands
- Province: North Brabant
- Municipality: Maashorst

Area
  - Total: 16.58 km^{2} (6.40 sq mi)
- Elevation: 19 m (62 ft)

Population (2021)
  - Total: 3,435
  - Density: 207.2/km^{2} (536.6/sq mi)
- Time zone: UTC+1 (CET)
  - Summer (DST): UTC+2 (CEST)
- Postal code: 5408
- Dialing code: 0413

Volkel (Brabantian: Vollekul) is a village in the Netherlands. It is situated in the north-east corner of the province of North Brabant, south-east of the town of Uden. On 1 January 2021, Volkel had 3,435 inhabitants. It used to be part of the municipality of Uden, before being merged into the municipality of Maashorst in 2022.

Volkel is known for Volkel Air Base of the Royal Netherlands Air Force (RNLAF) as well as the amusement park BillyBird Park Hemelrijk.

Volkel used to be a little village. In 1455, a chapel was built, but the village did not get a church until 1855. In 1940, a military airport was built near Volkel by the Germans. During Operation Market Garden, the airport was bombed many times. The damage was repaired afterwards, and it first served as an Allied airport and later it became Volkel Air Base.

== Gallery ==
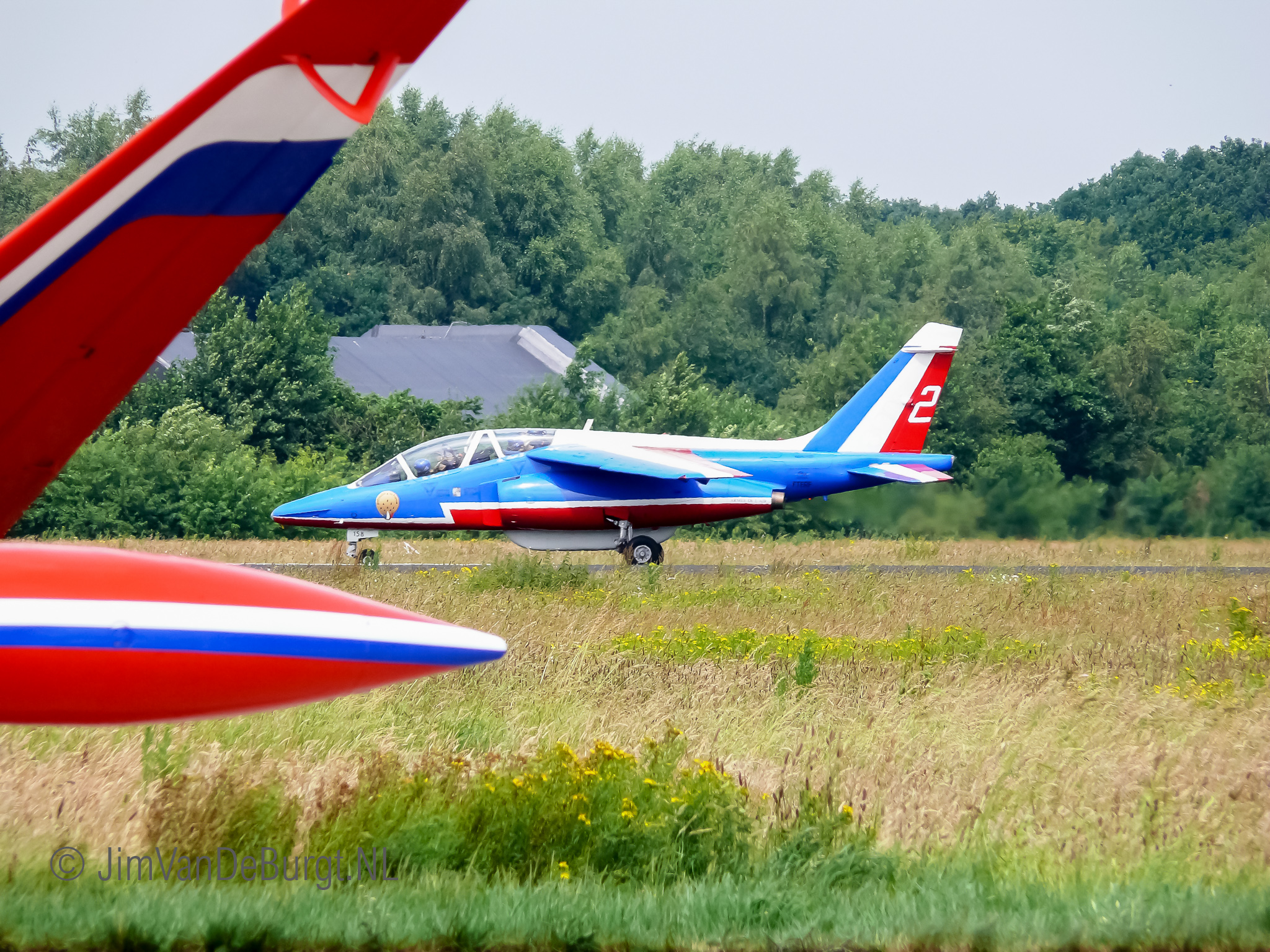
Patrouille de France at Volkel Air Base

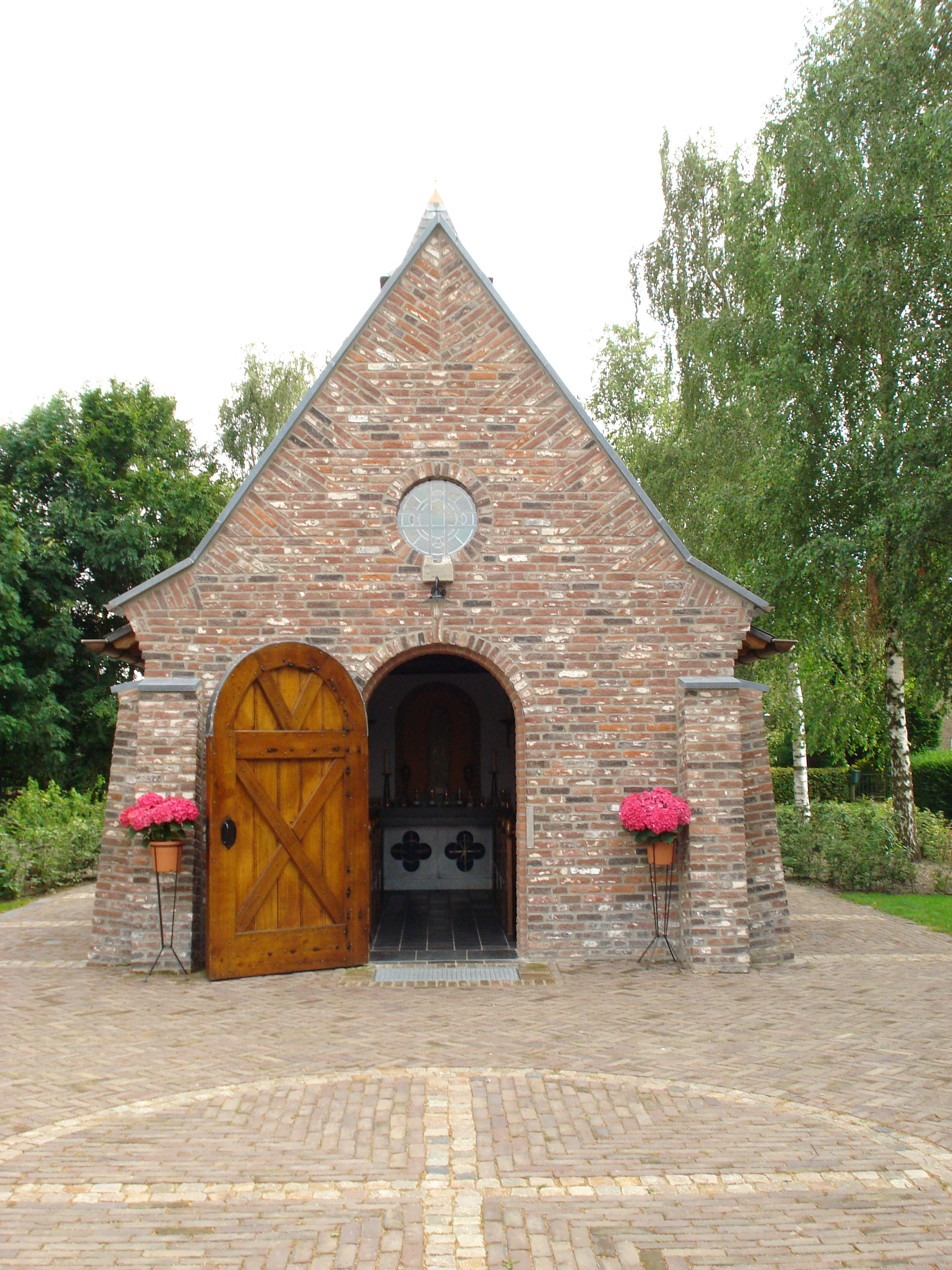
Chapel

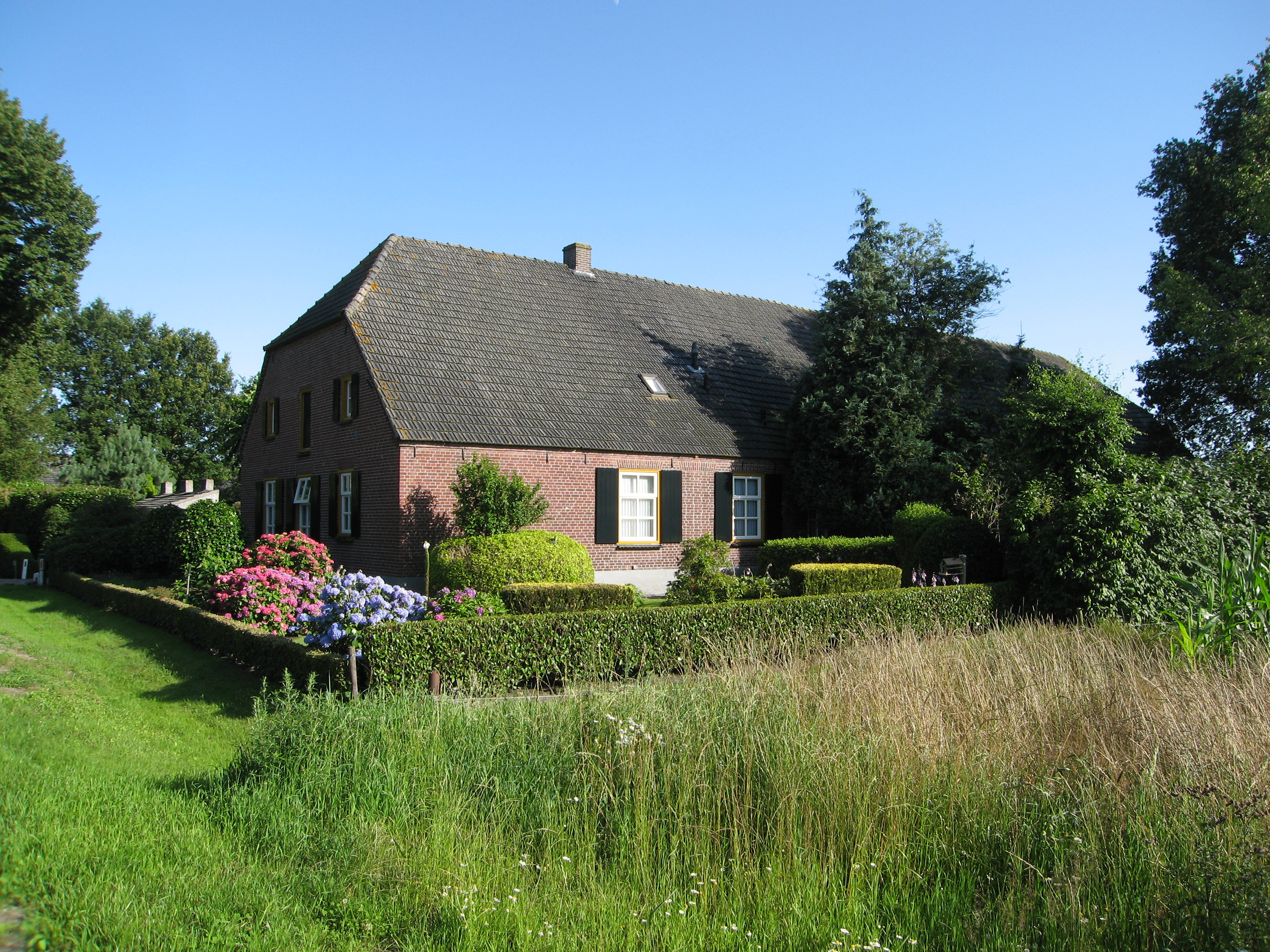
Farm in Volkel

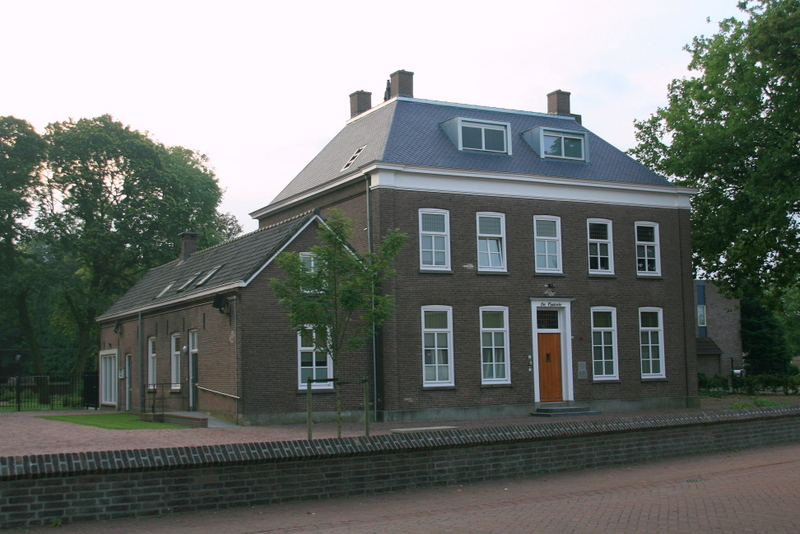
Clergy house

== Climate ==
Climate data for Volkel (1991−2020 normals, extremes 1951−present)
Month	Jan	Feb	Mar	Apr	May	Jun	Jul	Aug	Sep	Oct	Nov	Dec	Year
Record high °C (°F)	15.0 (59.0)	19.8 (67.6)	25.4 (77.7)	30.5 (86.9)	33.5 (92.3)	36.3 (97.3)	40.1 (104.2)	36.6 (97.9)	33.5 (92.3)	27.5 (81.5)	20.0 (68.0)	16.0 (60.8)	40.1 (104.2)
Mean daily maximum °C (°F)	5.9 (42.6)	7.0 (44.6)	10.8 (51.4)	15.3 (59.5)	19.1 (66.4)	21.9 (71.4)	24.0 (75.2)	23.7 (74.7)	19.9 (67.8)	14.9 (58.8)	9.8 (49.6)	6.4 (43.5)	14.9 (58.8)
Daily mean °C (°F)	3.2 (37.8)	3.6 (38.5)	6.3 (43.3)	9.9 (49.8)	13.6 (56.5)	16.5 (61.7)	18.5 (65.3)	18.0 (64.4)	14.7 (58.5)	10.7 (51.3)	6.7 (44.1)	3.9 (39.0)	10.5 (50.9)
Mean daily minimum °C (°F)	0.1 (32.2)	0.1 (32.2)	1.8 (35.2)	4.0 (39.2)	7.6 (45.7)	10.5 (50.9)	12.6 (54.7)	12.1 (53.8)	9.5 (49.1)	6.5 (43.7)	3.3 (37.9)	0.9 (33.6)	5.8 (42.4)
Record low °C (°F)	−20.1 (−4.2)	−25.2 (−13.4)	−13.7 (7.3)	−7.4 (18.7)	−2.1 (28.2)	0.1 (32.2)	2.7 (36.9)	2.7 (36.9)	−0.9 (30.4)	−6.2 (20.8)	−10.0 (14.0)	−18.8 (−1.8)	−25.2 (−13.4)
Average precipitation mm (inches)	64.0 (2.52)	58.2 (2.29)	52.7 (2.07)	40.4 (1.59)	57.6 (2.27)	64.1 (2.52)	70.6 (2.78)	73.4 (2.89)	59.4 (2.34)	61.8 (2.43)	64.8 (2.55)	72.2 (2.84)	739.2 (29.10)
Average relative humidity (%)	87.5	84.7	79.5	73.3	72.9	74.2	75.4	77.6	82.2	86.1	89.9	89.8	81.1
Mean monthly sunshine hours	69.2	90.7	143.3	190.2	217.4	211.8	215.4	198.9	158.2	121.8	72.9	56.1	1,745.9
Percentage possible sunshine	26.6	32.2	38.8	45.8	44.9	42.6	43.0	43.8	41.6	36.8	27.2	22.9	37.2
Source: Royal Netherlands Meteorological Institute
