= Christmas tree (aviation) =

Alert area for military aircraft

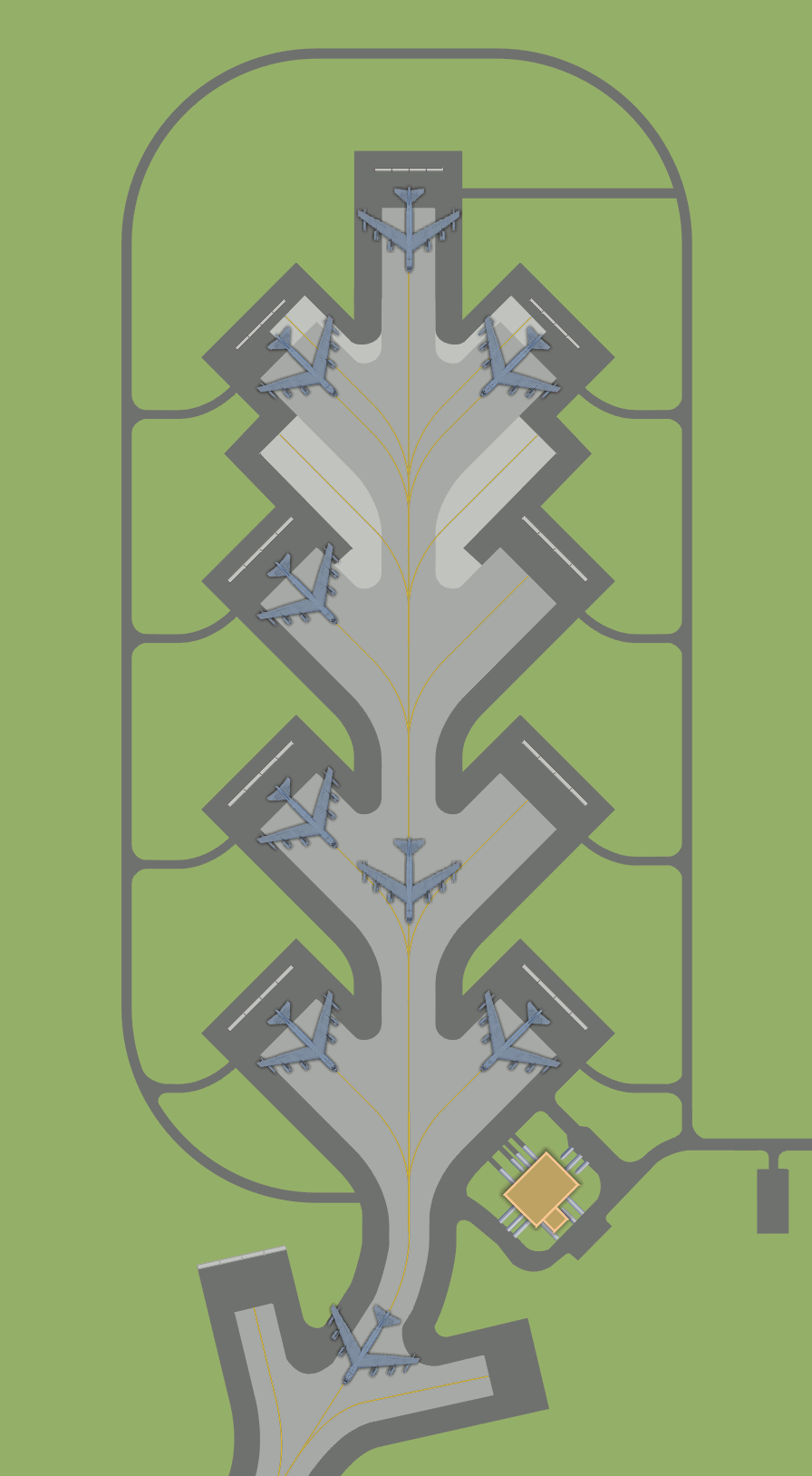
Diagram of 'Christmas tree' alert apron at Glasgow AFB, MT, c. 1957-1976. The yellow building in the lower right is a mole hole, also known as a readiness crew building.

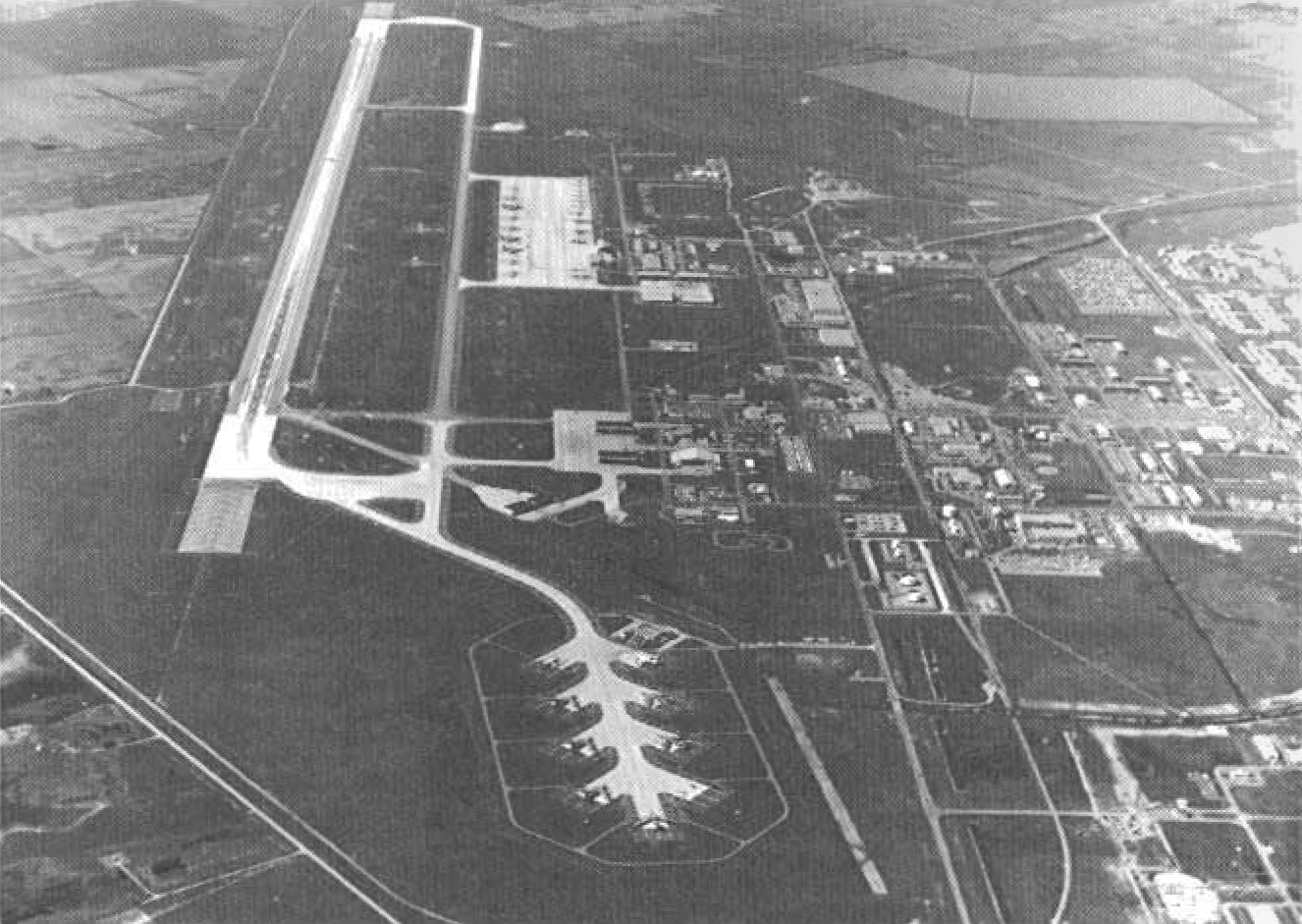
Minot AFB, ND, in 1973 with its 'Christmas tree' at capacity.

A Christmas tree was a type of alert area constructed by the United States Air Force (USAF) for the Strategic Air Command (SAC) during the Cold War. Oftentimes, bombers or tanker aircraft were stationed next to a readiness crew building (RCB), also known as 'mole hole' facilities. The alert apron, also known as an alert ramp, received the name 'Christmas tree', because in plan-form it resembled a tree of the same name.

== History ==
Before the development of the Boeing B-52 Stratofortress, aircraft such as the Convair B-36 Peacemaker, Boeing B-50 Superfortress and Boeing B-47 Stratojet were parked on alert aprons at right angles. Due to the sheer size of the aircraft, this created a problem in launching aircraft efficiently and rapidly in the event of an emergency scramble, requiring a different solution to be devised. To fix this, aircraft were repositioned on specifically designed alert aprons arranged in herringbone configurations, which then allowed the airplanes to pull out onto the runway as quickly as possible.

This meant that the aircraft would be positioned at 45 degrees in relation to an alert apron center-line, leading to a short taxiway and then onto the nearest runway(s). Two aircraft would be positioned on either side of the center-line, typically four deep on either side, sometimes with one additional aircraft being positioned directly aligned on the center-line farthest back. The success of this formation also led to the adoption of the setup for the Boeing KC-97 Stratofreighter and KB-50 Superfortress aerial refueling aircraft. As newer bomber and aircraft eventually entered the SAC inventory, the 'Christmas tree' aprons would be used by the B-47 Stratojet, B-52 Stratofortress, Convair B-58 Hustler, General Dynamics FB-111, Rockwell B-1 Lancer, Boeing KC-135 Stratotanker, and McDonnell Douglas KC-10 Extender aircraft.

During an alert, flight crews and ground crews would run out of the alert facility, i.e. the 'mole hole', either to their awaiting airplanes, or to alert vehicles that they would drive to said aircraft. This latter option was particularly critical for crews of the last three aircraft on the ramp that were located several hundred yards from the alert facility.

During an alert sortie, there was no specific departure order; the first plane ready to taxi was the first to leave. At this point, the aircraft would perform an 'elephant walk' to the duty runway, which was typically located close to the Christmas tree, due to the need to launch the aircraft as quickly as possible in response to a probable inbound enemy attack. If the aircraft were to be launched as quickly as possible, then a Minimum Interval Takeoff (MITO) would be performed, in order to lessen the chance that the aircraft would be caught on the ground in the event of a nuclear strike.

Although it is unknown how much each 'Christmas tree' cost to construct and maintain, the Christmas tree at the former Loring Air Force Base, Maine is estimated to have cost $400,000 (equivalent to $4.25 million in today's dollars) when it was constructed between 1959 and 1960.

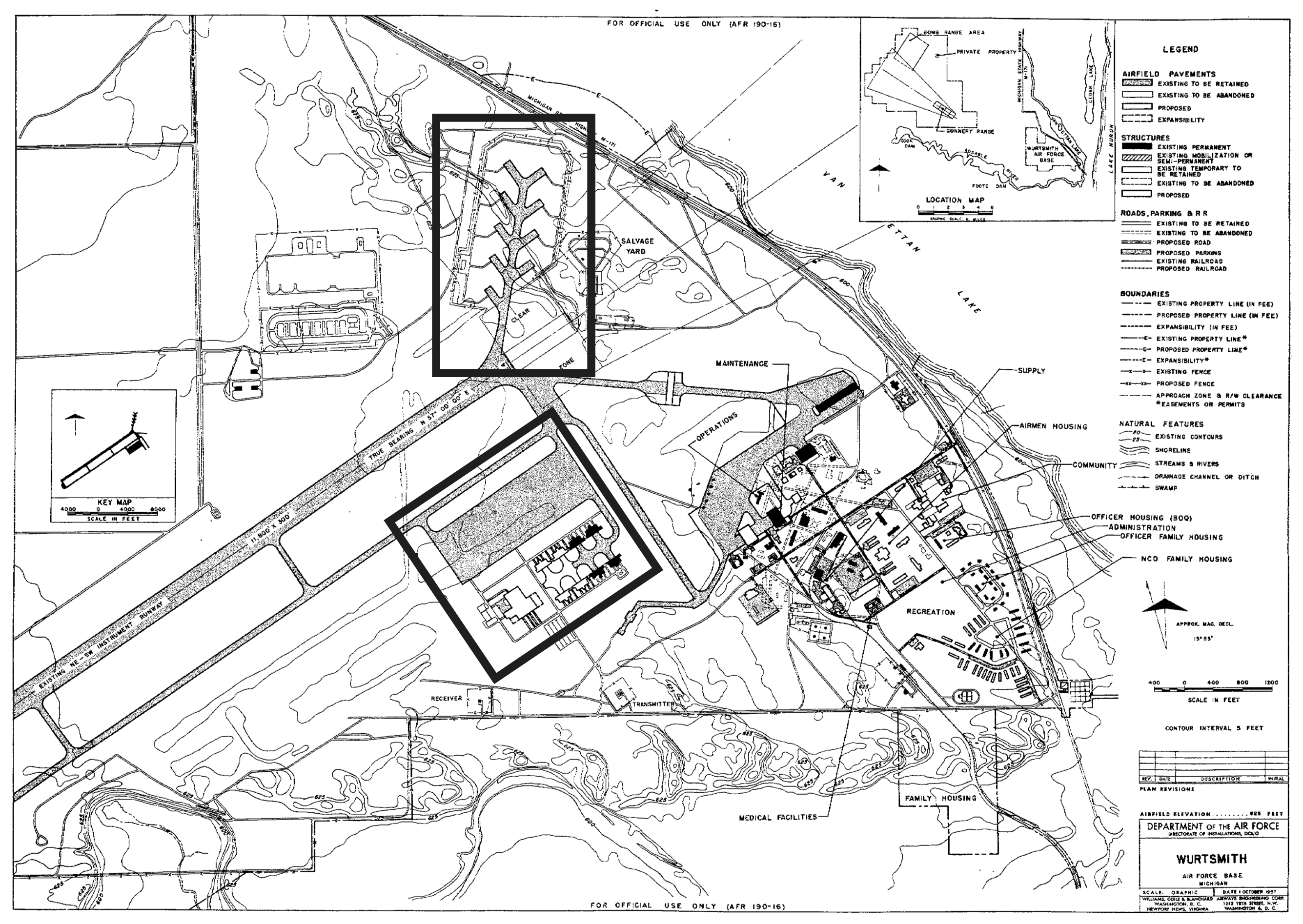
In this Department of the Air Force site master plan for Wurtsmith Air Force Base from October 1957, the top box highlight the Christmas tree for bombers on ready alert, while the bottom box is the stubbed apron where aerial refueling tankers were kept.

Although Strategic Air Command was disestablished in 1992, 'Christmas tree' aprons and their associated 'mole holes' continue to exist on numerous Air Force Global Strike Command, Air Combat Command, Air Mobility Command, Air Education and Training Command, Air Force Reserve Command, and Air National Guard bases, as well as two active Army Air Fields, and several civilian and joint civil-military airports that were previously SAC installations for all or part of the 1950s through the 1990s.
