= Scrambling (military) =

Quickly getting military aircraft airborne

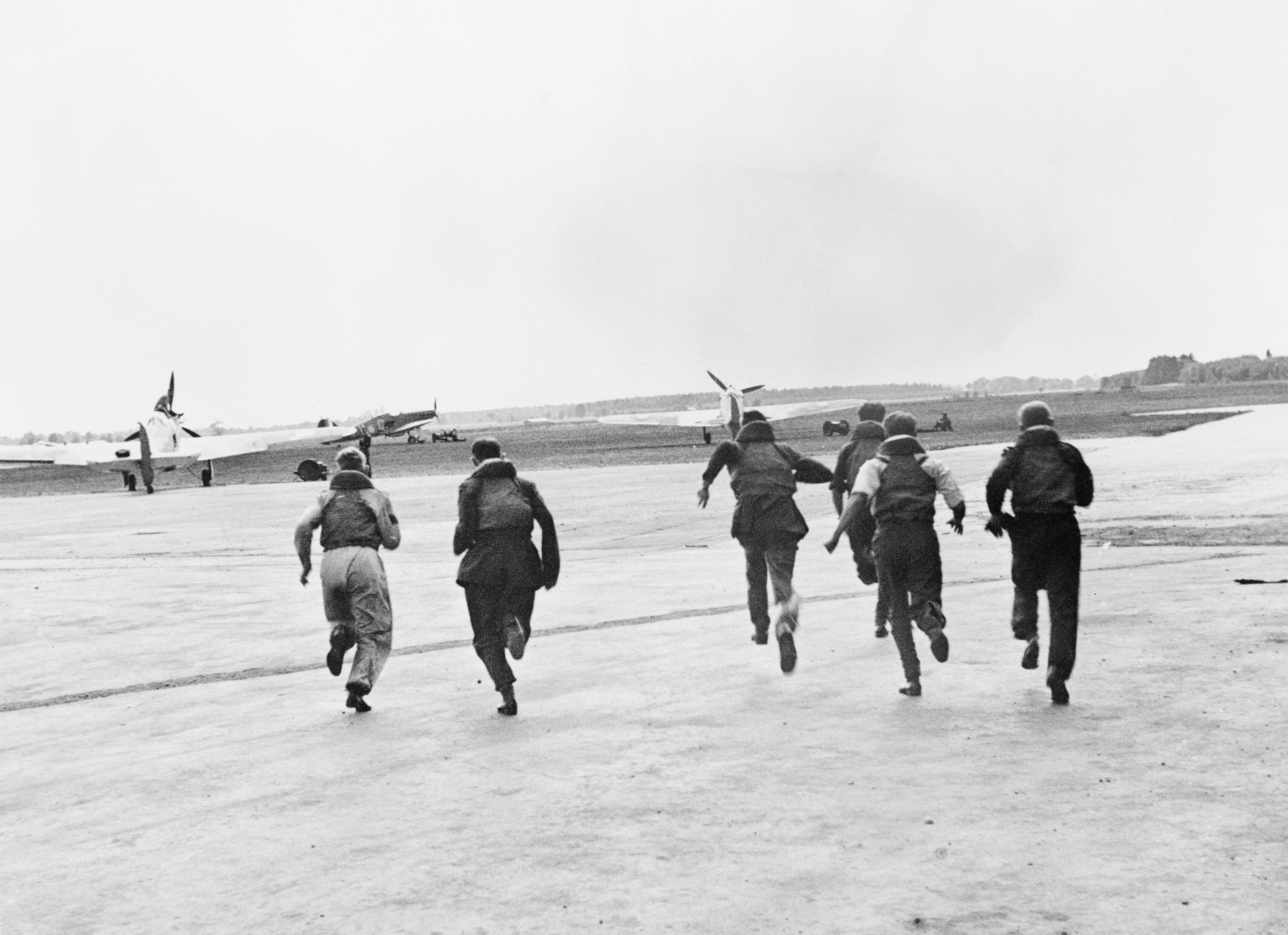
Pilots running to their Hawker Hurricane aircraft during the Battle of Britain

In military aviation, scrambling is the act of quickly mobilising military aircraft. Scrambling can be in reaction to an immediate threat, usually to intercept hostile aircraft.

== Battle of Britain ==
The term was used during the Battle of Britain, when Royal Air Force pilots and their fighters were readied and available to fly. Detection and monitoring of enemy aircraft, e.g. by the Chain Home radar stations, would feed into the RAF Fighter Command's Dowding system for control and management of the defenses. Once a decision had been made to intercept the enemy formation a telephone call would be made to the chosen fighter squadron's airfield, and those air crews available would be scrambled. The scramble order was communicated to alert pilots waiting by their aircraft by the loud ringing of a bell. Every minute lost before takeoff would be advantageous to the enemy, as it could allow a pilot to gain extra height above the advancing plane formations.

Information passed to the scrambling fighters included location and height: "Angels" with a number was used to describe height of aircraft, such as "Angels One Five" for aircraft approaching at 15,000 ft (4,600 m), and a rough estimate of numbers. Unidentified aircraft were known as bogeys, and known enemy ones were called bandits.

== Cold War to present ==
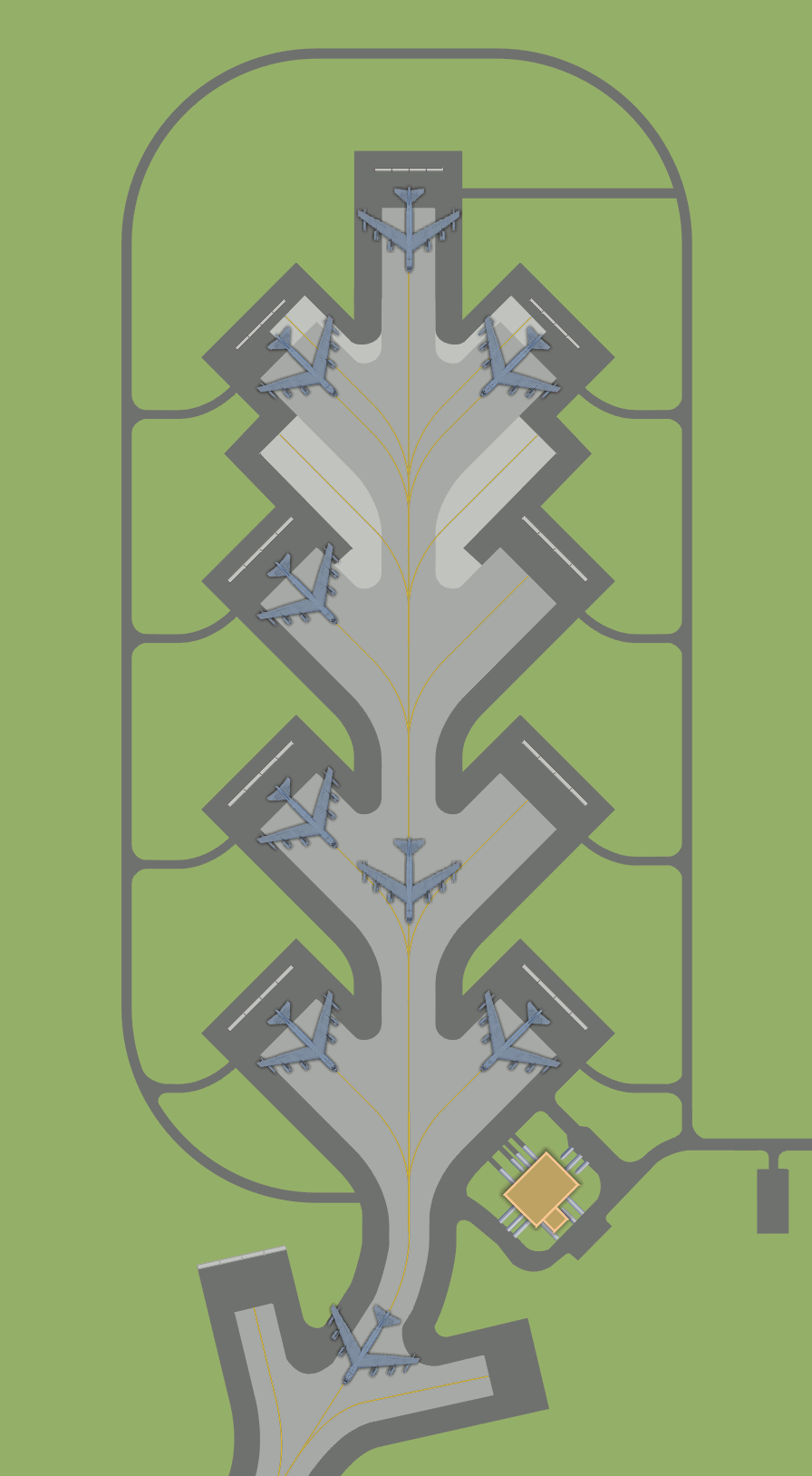
'Christmas tree' taxiways facilitated rapid deployment of Cold War strategic bombers

During the Cold War, many NATO air forces had crews stationed in Europe on alert and scrambled whenever their airspace was penetrated. The rudimentary bell-ringing communication was eventually replaced by electronic radio communication methods. However, many fighter squadrons into the current era would keep a bell at their squadron bar in legacy to the Battle of Britain roots. A common tradition was that anyone at the bar who rang the bell would be required to buy a round of drinks for all present.

Both interceptors and nuclear bomber forces were kept on "Quick Reaction Alert" (QRA). Crews were kept close to or in their aircraft positioned on Operational Readiness Platforms (ORPs) at the runway, which were expected to be able to take off within a short period, such as 15 minutes, in less-than-normal situations. It could be only two minutes at times of heightened tension between the opposing powers.

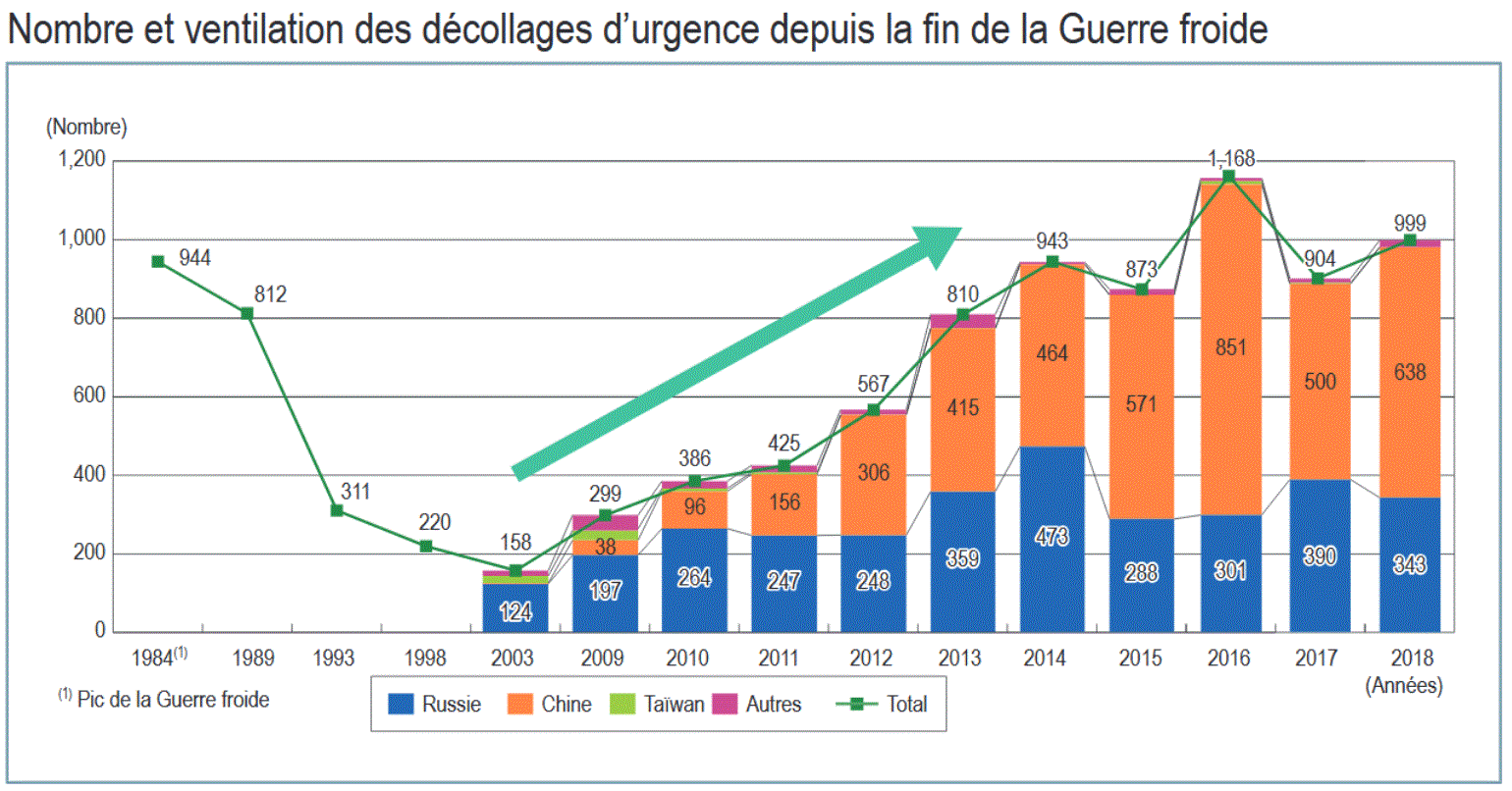
Scrambling for the Japan Air Self-Defense Force 1984 - 2018.

Today, QRA involves keeping two aircraft with their air and ground crews on a 24/7 readiness to launch within a few minutes. Scrambles are categorised as Alpha-Scrambles (A-Scrambles) and Tango-Scrambles (T-Scrambles). An A-Scramble is a real interception mission, when the pair of military jets takes off armed with live weaponry to intercept another aircraft in defence of the airspace. Such missions can also be ordered for various reasons, including deviation from an authorised route or loss of radio contact. A T-Scramble or "Training Scramble" is a training mission simulating a real interception mission.

== See also ==
- Index of aviation articles
- List of established military terms
- Combat readiness
- Minimum Interval Takeoff
- Interceptor aircraft
- Ground-controlled interception
- Glossary of RAF code names
- Operational Readiness Platform
- Point defense
