= Glasgow Air Force Base =

Former United States Air Force base near Glasgow, Montana

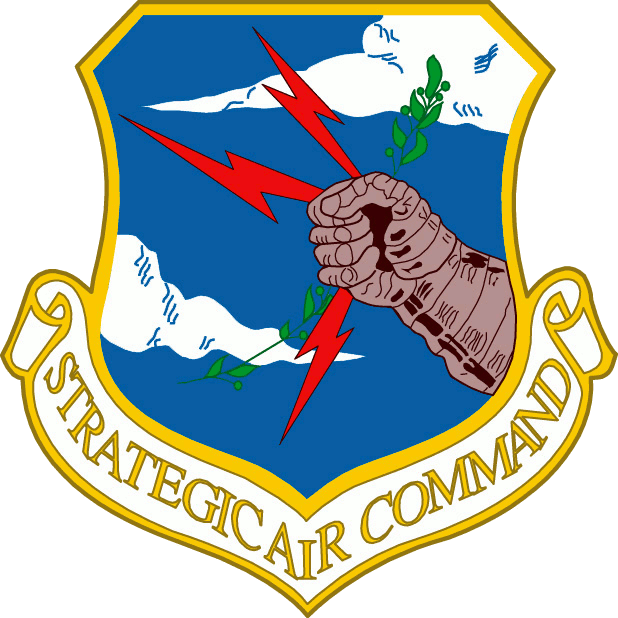
Glasgow Air Force Base
- Part of Strategic Air Command/Air Defense Command
- St. Marie, Valley County, near Glasgow, Montana
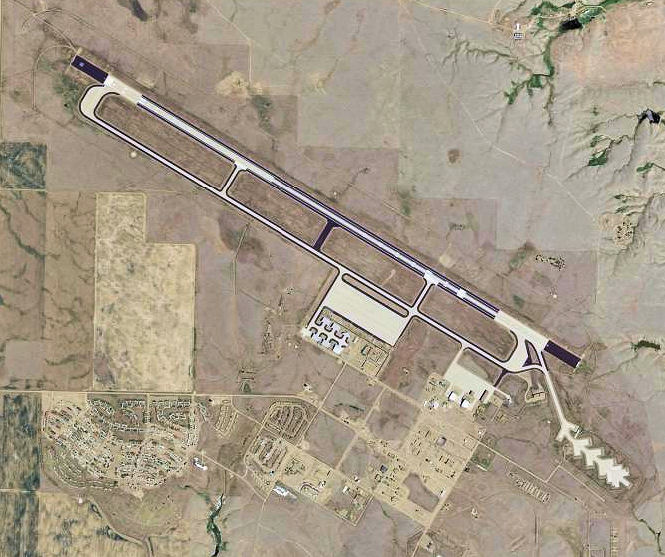
- USGS aerial photo as of 2006. Note the "Christmas tree" at bottom right.

Site information
- Type: Air Force base

Location
- Coordinates: 48°25′16″N 106°31′40″W

Site history
- Built: 1957
- In use: 1957–1968; 1971–1976

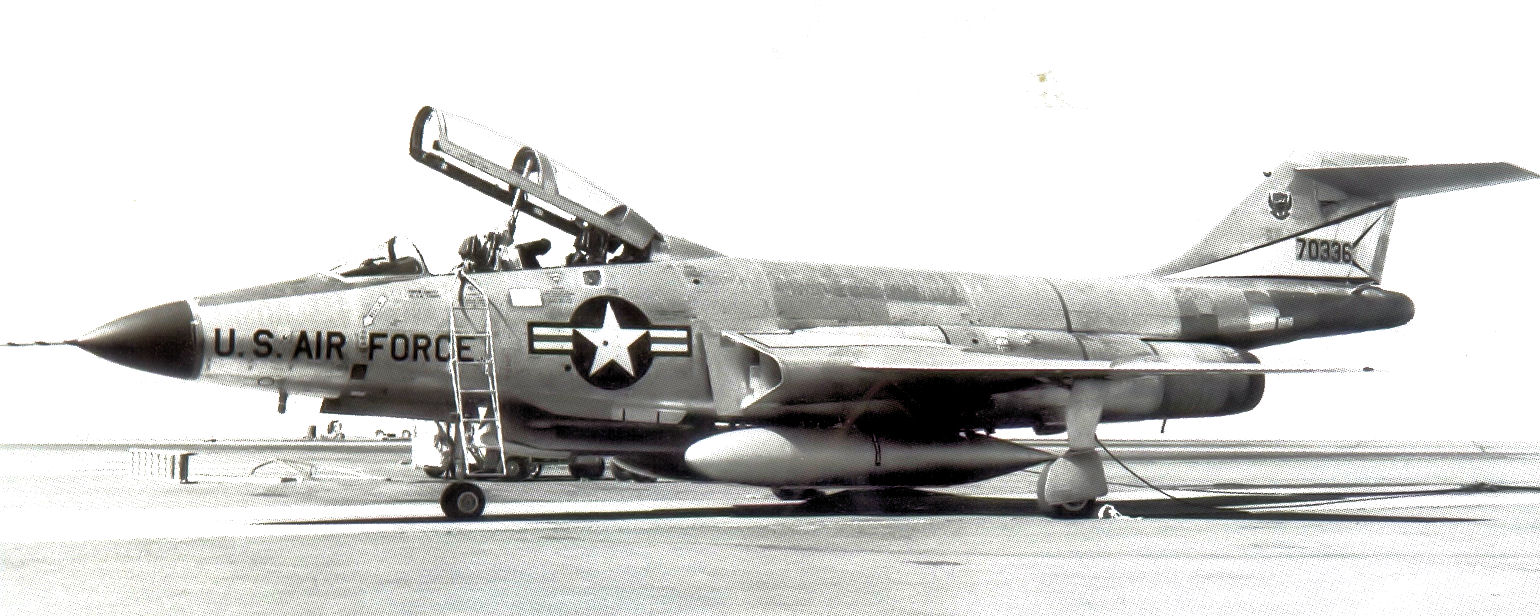
13th Fighter-Interceptor Squadron McDonnell F-101B-90-MC Voodoo 57-0336 Glasgow AFB, Montana September 1962

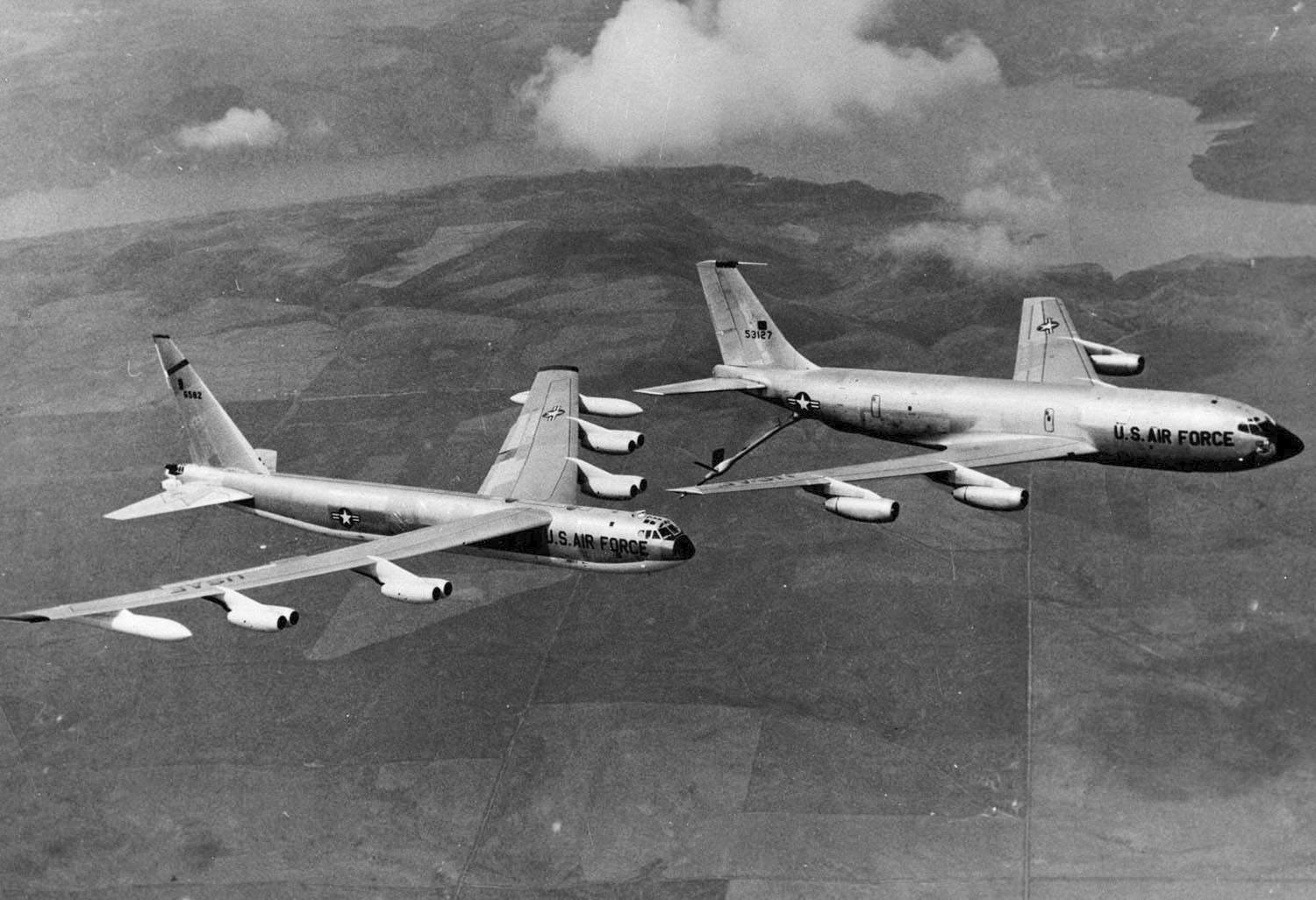
Strategic Air Command B-52D Stratofortress (AF Serial No. 56-0582) being refueled by a KC-135A Stratotanker (AF Serial No. 55-3127)

Glasgow Air Force Base is a former United States Air Force base near Glasgow, Montana. It operated from 1957 to 1968 and again from 1971 through 1976.

== Major commands to which assigned ==
- Air Defense Command, 8 February 1957 – 1 April 1960

Remained as tenant unit until 30 June 1968

Central Air Defense Force, 2 July 1959
29th Air Division (Defense), 1 April 1960
Minot Air Defense Sector, 1 January 1961 – 30 June 1968

- Strategic Air Command, 1 April 1960 – 30 June 1968; 30 September 1971 – 30 September 1976

Fifteenth Air Force

810th Strategic Aerospace Division, 1 July 1962 – 1 July 1963; 1 July 1966 – 30 June 1968
18th Strategic Aerospace Division, 1 July 1963 – 1 September 1964
821st Strategic Aerospace Division, 15 February 1962 – 1 July 1962; 1 September 1964 – 1 July 1966

== Major units assigned ==
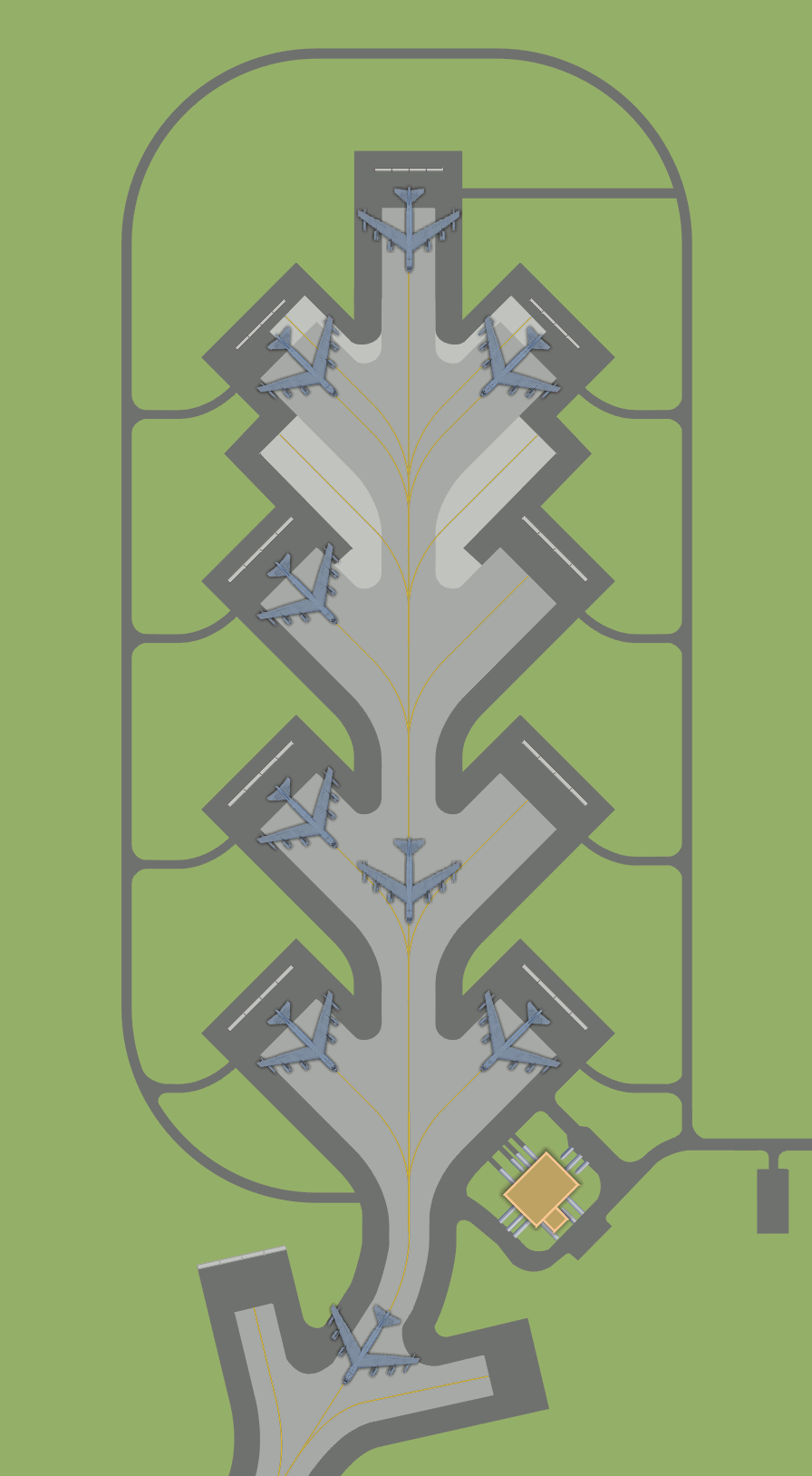
Diagram of a Christmas tree at Glasgow, with the mole hole in the lower right-hand corner

- 476th Fighter Group (Defense), 8 February 1957 – 30 June 1968

Not equipped, 8 February 1957 – 2 July 1959
13th Fighter-Interceptor Squadron, 2 July 1959 – 30 June 1968 (F-101B)

- 4141st Strategic Wing, 1 September 1958 – 1 February 1963

Not equipped, 1 September 1958 – 1 February 1961
326th Bombardment Squadron, 1 February 1961 – 1 February 1963 (B-52C)

- 91st Bombardment Wing 18 November 1962 – 30 June 1968

322d Bombardment Squadron, 1 February 1963 – 25 June 1968 (B-52C/D)

Detached to Advanced Echelon, 3d Air Division: 11 September 1966 – 31 March 1967; 5 February – 30 April 1968
(deployed to Andersen Air Force Base, Guam for Arc Light Missions)
(deployed to Kadena Air Force Base, Okinawa for Operation Port Bow; 5 February – 30 April 1968)
Not operational: 1 May – 25 June 1968

907th Air Refueling Squadron, 1 July 1963 – 25 June 1968 (KC-135A)

Detached to Advanced Echelon, 3d Air Division: 11 September 1966 – 31 March 1967; 5 February – 30 April 1968
(deployed to Andersen Air Force Base, Guam and Kadena Air Force Base, Okinawa)
Not operational: 1 May – 25 June 1968

- 4300th Air Base Squadron, 17 November 1971 – 30 September 1976

Detached from Fairchild Air Force Base, Washington, for dispersed B-52/KC-135 operations

Note: All aircraft deployed to Fairchild Air Force Base, Washington, 1 April – 30 June 1964 due to runway repairs
References for commands and major units assigned:

== See also ==
- List of military installations in Montana

== Sources ==
- Ravenstein, Charles A. Air Force Combat Wings Lineage and Honors Histories 1947–1977. Maxwell Air Force Base, Alabama: Office of Air Force History 1984. ISBN 0-912799-12-9.
- SAC Bases: Glasgow Air Force Base
- Boeing Technical Services - Flight Test Facility
- Abandoned & Little-Known Airfields: Glasgow AFB, Montana
