= Minimum interval takeoff =

Military maneuver of the US Air Force

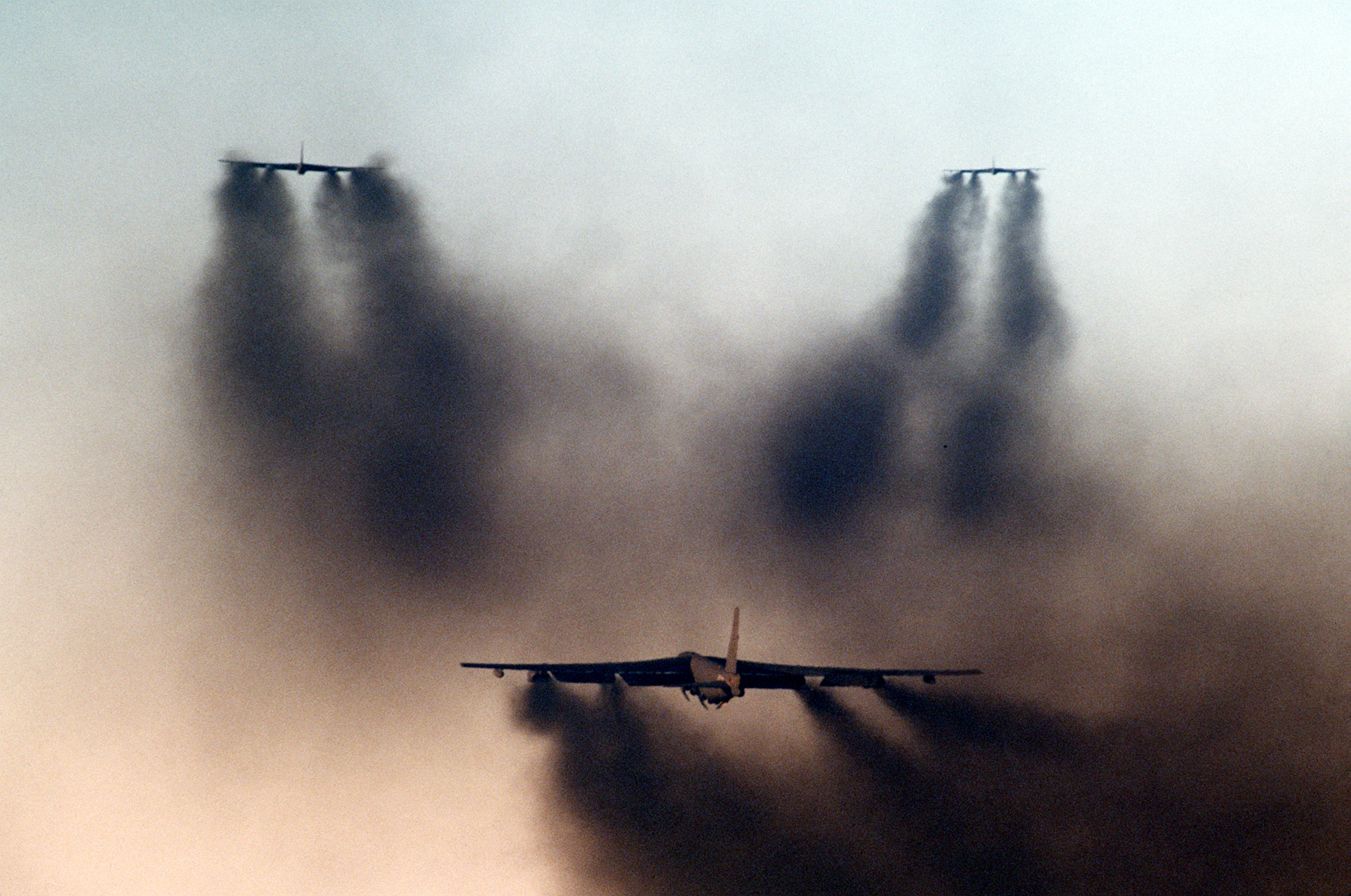
Three U.S. Air Force B-52G aircraft depart Barksdale AFB during a MITO exercise in 1986

A minimum interval takeoff (MITO) is a technique of the United States Air Force for scrambling all available bomber and tanker aircraft at twelve- and fifteen-second intervals, respectively. Before takeoff, the aircraft perform an elephant walk to the runway. It is designed to maximize the number of aircraft launched in the least time possible before the base suffers a nuclear strike, which would obliterate all remaining aircraft.

Although the practice is aimed to efficiently send aircraft off as quickly as possible, it does not come without risks. Sending aircraft into the wake turbulence of another aircraft at such close intervals could cause unpredictable aerodynamic behavior and loss of aircraft control. More than once, aircraft have crashed on takeoff after encountering such wake turbulence.

== Description ==
The minimum interval takeoff was designed by the U.S. Air Force to get its bomber fleet in the air within fifteen minutes of an alert of an incoming missile attack, that being the time in which the bases would be obliterated. Although it had roots during World War II, the tactic came of age during the Cold War under the Strategic Air Command (SAC).

== Tactical use ==
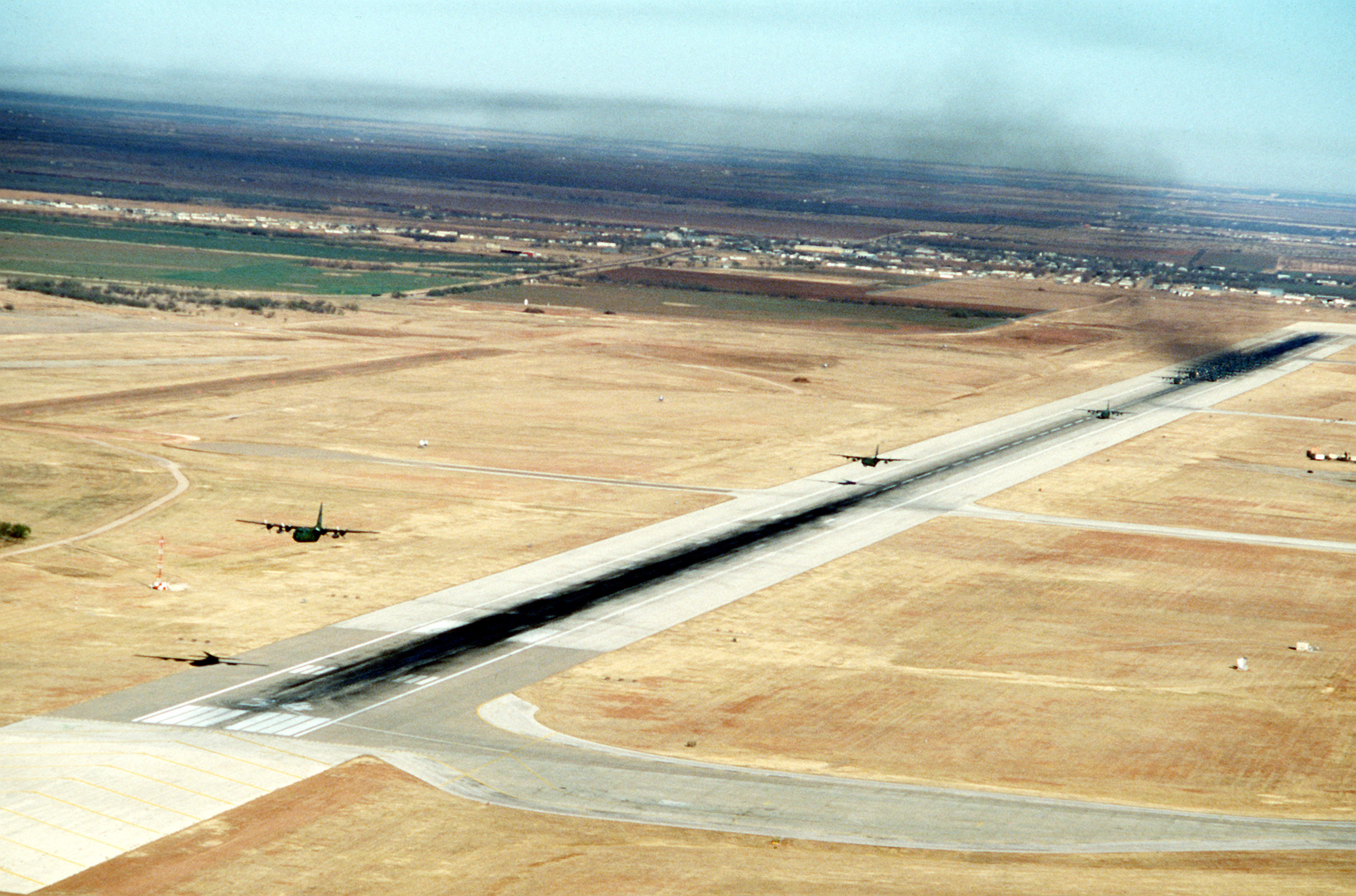
Two C-130 Hercules aircraft of the 463rd Tactical Airlift Wing get airborne as the remaining 16 aircraft wait on the runway during a MITO at the start of a mass airdrop exercise at Dyess AFB, Texas

Strategic Air Command bomber and tanker crews frequently practiced these drills, as they knew they had to send up the maximum number of planes, in the fastest time possible. This was done to prevent possible obliteration should the base be attacked by nuclear warheads. In theory, the whole procedure had to be done as soon as possible, as there would be minutes to spare in the event of an attack warning. This meant that the aircraft were launched as quickly as twelve seconds between bombers, and fifteen seconds between the tankers.

Normally, aircraft are delayed from taking off until the turbulence created by the aircraft ahead of it has dissipated. Because of the small launch window, this made the air very rough for the next minute for the aircraft, during the takeoff roll and initial climbout. Water injection in the J57 turbojet engines produced extra power for takeoff but caused large amounts of unburned fuel to leave the engine in the exhaust, producing large amounts of black smoke which the subsequent aircraft would also have to go through in order to take off successfully. The J57 was fitted to all B-52s with the exception of the H-model, which has TF33 turbofans. During alerts, the crews performed an elephant walk from the Christmas tree, and then launched as quickly as possible. Typically, takeoff clearance was received by the aircraft once the aircraft ahead of it was on the runway.

Upon taking off, the navigator called milestones, indicating the minimum speed at important positions on the runway. If the aircraft wasn't at speed during S1 time (120 knots (138 mph; 222 km/h)), the plane aborted takeoff. If S1 was successfully achieved, the wings start generating lift, exposed to the violent turbulence that it immediately encountered. The nose is still held kept down at this point. At 152 knots (175 mph; 282 km/h), another milestone, pilot pulls the yoke back, and the plane lifts off.

At Pease Air Force Base, New Hampshire, it has been reported that Boeing B-47 Stratojet aircraft launched at opposing sides of the single runway at 7.5-second intervals, half that of a normal MITO. Later, Pease and Plattsburgh Air Force Base, New York, were equipped with FB-111 strategic bombers and the MITO interval was reduced to just six seconds between aircraft, if they used alternating opposite sides of the same runway. KC-135 tanker aircraft of Pease and Plattsburgh used a twelve-second MITO interval using the runway centerline.

== Incidents ==
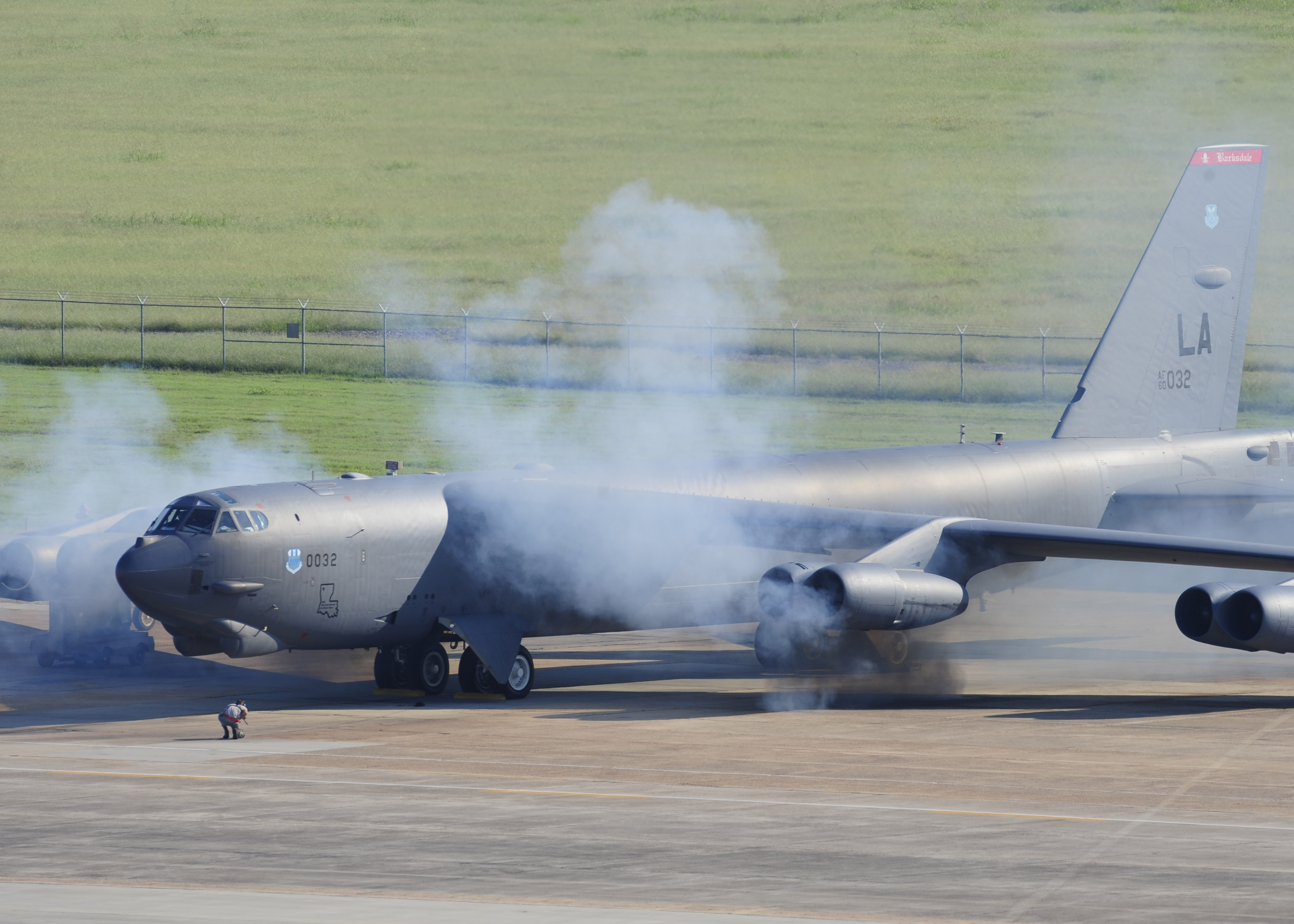
A B-52H starts its engines during a MITO at Barksdale AFB in 2014

One B-52 was involved in a crash during a MITO when the aircraft stalled. On the morning of December 16, 1982, A B-52G Stratofortress of the 328th Bombardment Squadron, 93rd Bombardment Wing, at Castle Air Force Base, California, crashed while attempting a MITO, killing all nine crewmembers on board. It had just taken off from Mather Air Force Base near Sacramento when they encountered trouble. The aircraft, carrying 290,000 pounds (130,000 kg) of fuel, crashed about 1.5 miles (2.4 km) from Mather and blew up in a ball of fire around 250 feet (75 m) in diameter. The resulting crash left a 1,200-foot (370 m) path of burning debris, killed three horses, and left four people needing treatment for smoke inhalation. The cause was determined to have been the result of the jet trying to avoid the jet blast of the lead plane, showing the inherent risk behind launching aircraft so close together.

A "Broken Arrow" incident originated from a minimum interval takeoff incident on December 8, 1964. During a normal MITO at Bunker Hill Air Force Base, Indiana, a delta-winged B-58 Hustler, loaded with five nuclear weapons, suffered a landing gear failure. This caused the pilot to lose control, which also caused a rupture of the fuel cell holding JP-4 fuel, causing an immediate fire under the aircraft. The pilot and defensive systems operator survived the fire and abandoned the aircraft; the navigator ejected, but was killed. The resulting fire consumed the aircraft and some nuclear weapons, causing contamination in the immediate vicinity.

On 4 January 1961, during a minimum interval takeoff from Pease AFB, a B-47E, 53-4244, of the 100th Bomb Wing, second of a three-ship cell, lost control, crashed into trees, and burned. The aircraft commander, Capt. Thomas C. Weller, co-pilot 1st Lt. Ronald Chapo, navigator 1st Lt. J. A. Wether, and crew chief S/Sgt. Stephen J. Merva were killed.

== Pop culture ==
There is a scene from the 1963 film A Gathering of Eagles during which a MITO is observed to occur from beside the runway at Beale Air Force Base, California. The scene involves Colonels James Caldwell (played by Rock Hudson) and Hollis Farr (Rod Taylor) standing a few thousand feet down the runway, watching B-52 Stratofortresses take off at fifteen-second intervals.

== See also ==
- Index of aviation articles
- List of established military terms
- Operational Readiness Platform
- Combat readiness
- Scrambling (military)
