= Elephant walk (aeronautics) =

Aircraft taxiing in close formation before takeoff

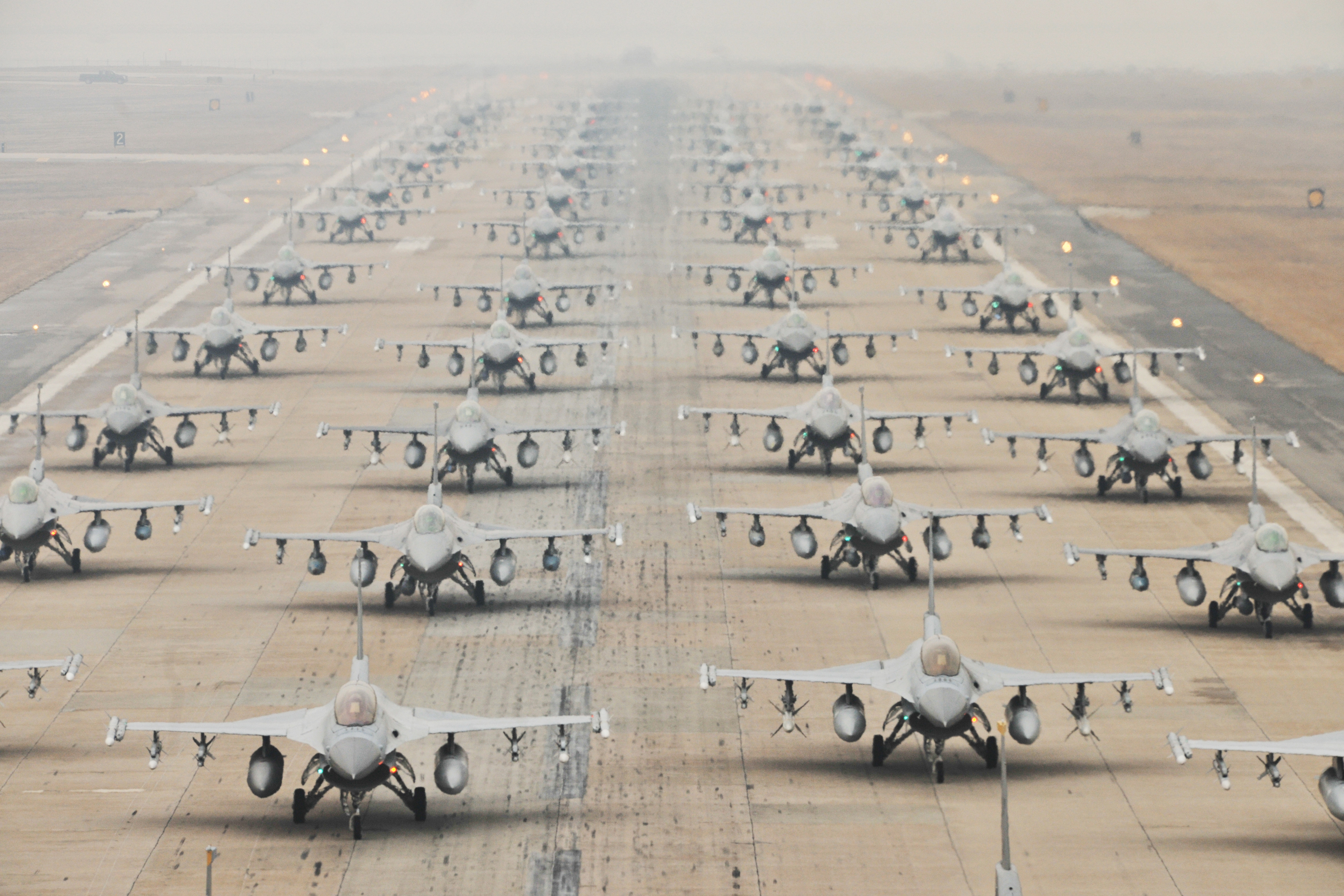
F-16 Fighting Falcon fighters of the American and South Korean air forces demonstrate an "elephant walk" formation as they taxi down a runway at Kunsan Air Base during an exercise in 2012.

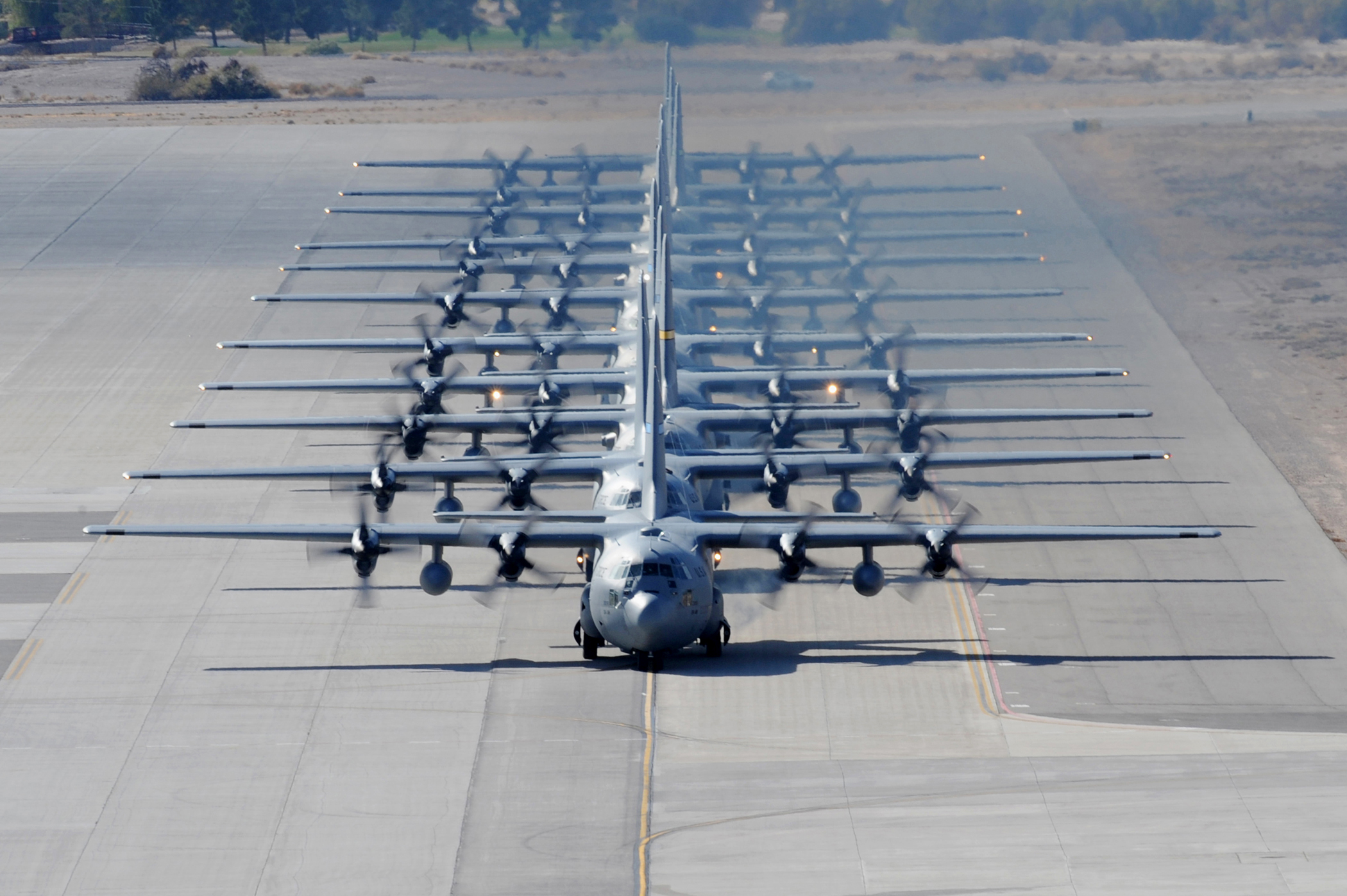
An "Elephant Walk" of eleven C-130 Hercules at Nellis Air Force Base, 2009

An elephant walk is a term used by the United States Air Force (USAF) for the taxiing of military aircraft right before takeoff, when they are in close formation. Often, it takes place right before a minimum interval takeoff.

== Origins ==
The term elephant walk dates to World War II when large fleets of allied bombers would conduct attacks in missions containing 1,000 aircraft. Those who observed the taxiing of these large numbers of aircraft to take off in single file in nose-to-tail formations said that they looked like elephants walking to the next watering hole. Over time, it was incorporated into the lexicon of the United States Air Force to identify a "maximum sortie surge".

== Tactical use ==
The benefits of an elephant walk include being able to show the capability of the units as well as teamwork. It is often performed to prepare squadrons for wartime operations and to prepare pilots for the launching of fully armed aircraft in one mass event.

== Other uses ==
During Operations Linebacker and Linebacker II during the Vietnam War, the term was used as a nickname for the long lines of Boeing B-52 Stratofortress aircraft as they approached their targets. Although the tight groupings were necessary for electronic warfare, their paths were predictable and they were slow targets for North Vietnamese surface-to-air missiles. Within two weeks, the Air Force altered its tactics and began to vary the incoming paths of bombers. In addition to changing this aspect of the attack, the bombers were told to take longer turns after discharging their load, instead of the sharp turn which gave them greater radar exposure. The practice is also used by some aerobatic teams, particularly those associated with a military branch such as the Blue Angels or Thunderbirds of the United States and Canada's Snowbirds, with the teams' aircraft taxiing in tight formation to the runway and maintaining such grouping during takeoff.
