= Czech Air Force =

Aerial warfare branch of the Czech Republic

- Vzdušné síly
- Emblem of the Czech Air Force
- Founded: 1 January 1993 (33 years, 10 months)
- Country: Czech Republic
- Type: Air force
- Role: Aerial warfare
- Size: 102 all aircraft 5200 soldiers
- Part of: Czech Armed Forces
- Headquarters: Prague
- Mottos: Czech: Vzduch je naše moře "The air is our sea"

Commanders
- Air Force Commander: Major General Petr Čepelka

Insignia
- Roundel

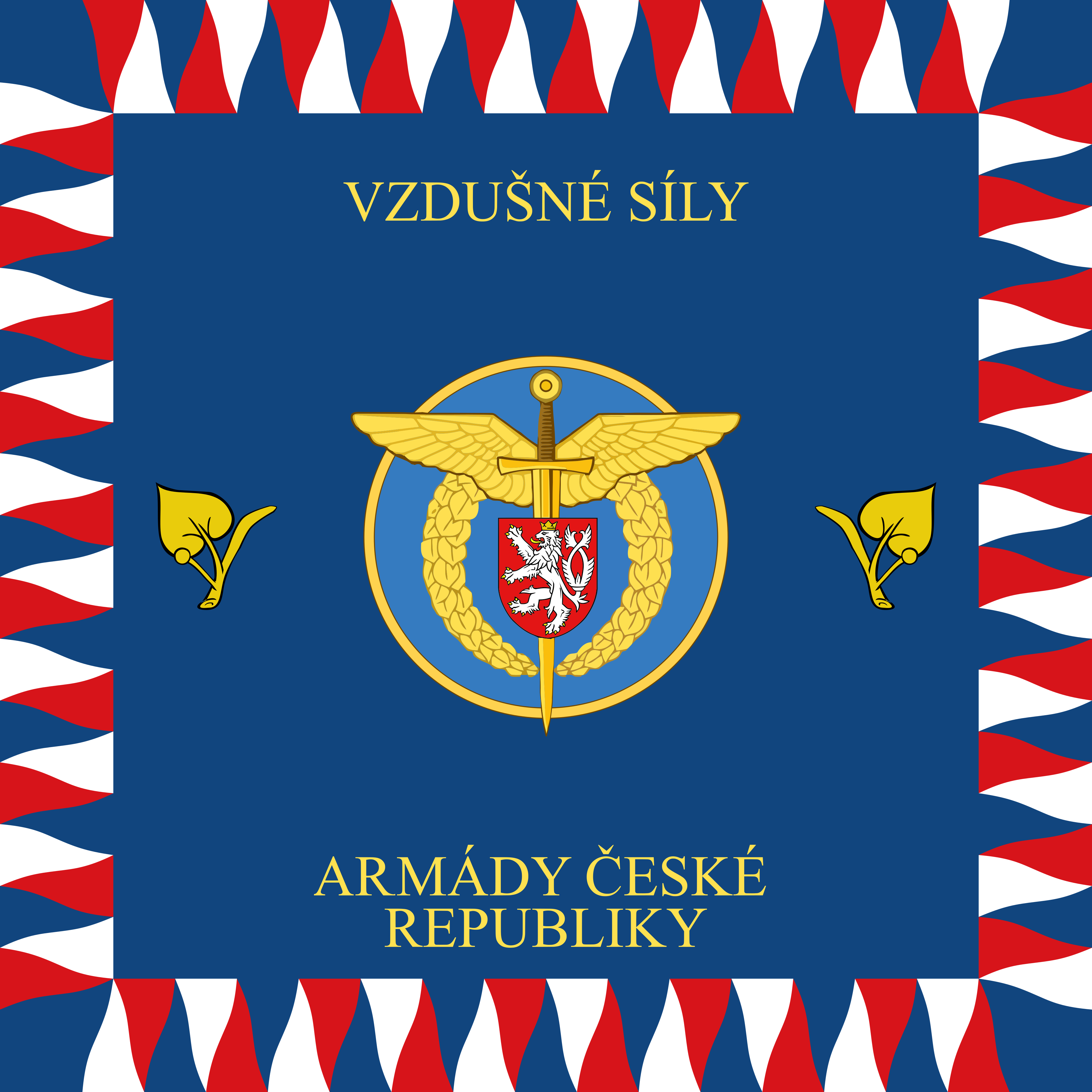
- Flag

Aircraft flown
- Attack: L-159A ALCA
- Fighter: JAS 39 Gripen
- Helicopter: Mi-17, W-3A, UH-1Y Venom, AH-1Z Viper
- Reconnaissance: L-410FG
- Trainer: L-159T1/T2
- Transport: C-295M, A319CJ, L-410UVP, Embraer C-390 Millennium
- Tanker: Embraer C-390 Millennium

The Czech Air Force (Czech: Vzdušné síly) (Note: Vzdušné síly Armády České republiky in full, literally the "Air Force of the Army of the Czech Republic") is the air force branch of the Czech Armed Forces. Along with the Land Forces, the Air Force is the major Czech military force. With traditions of military aviation dating back to 1918, the Czech Air Force, together with the Slovak Air Force, succeeded the Czechoslovak Air Force in 1993. On 1 July 1997, the 3rd Tactical Aviation Corps and the 4th Air Defence Corps of the Czech Army were merged to form an independent Air Force Headquarters.

The air force is responsible for securing the integrity of the Czech airspace through the NATO Integrated Air Defence System (NIADS), close air support to the Land Forces and for transportation tasks including government and state priority flights. In peacetime the air force contributes to tasks originating in the Czech laws and inter-ministerial agreements, for example to the air ambulance service or the SAR role.

Czech JAS 39C/D Gripen multirole fighters fulfill primarily the tasks related to the air defence of the Czech Republic and the NATO within the system of NATINAMDS. In the so-called national reinforcement system the subsonic L-159 ALCA jets could be deployed to fulfil this task too. The radar surveillance of the airspace of the Czech Republic is the responsibility of the 26th Air Command, Control and Surveillance Regiment at Stará Boleslav. Altogether seven radio-technical companies are spread around the country so that they can continuously cover its whole territory.

== History ==
=== First years ===
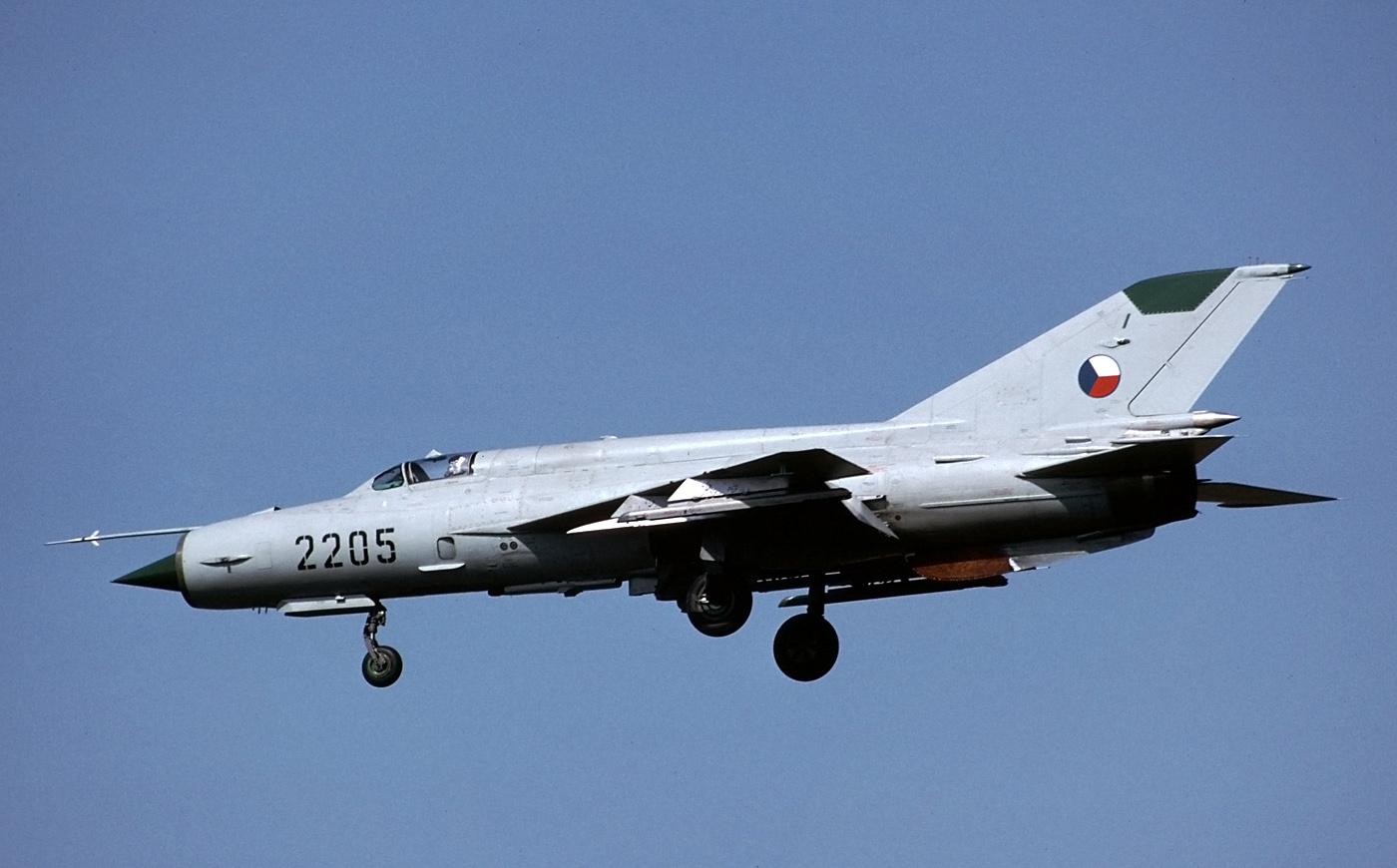
A Czech Air Force MiG-21MF

The separation saw a large reduction in types, numbers, and bases. In 1994, the 3rd Corps of Tactical Aviation was created. The newest fighter in the Czechoslovak Air Force arsenal was the MiG-29 (Izdelie 9.12). As there was only one general maintenance kit, which was given to newly created Slovak Republic, and all the material was split 1:1 with Slovakia, maintenance costs for the Czech Fulcrums would be too high. Along with the unreasonably high costs, speculative costs for spare parts imported from Russia, which were realised through third-party companies (Mil Mi-24 rotor blades acquisitions were over-priced by 400%), this led to the exchange of 10 MiG-29s with Poland for PZL W-3A Sokół rescue helicopters with avionics and ground support. Therefore, 10 air superiority fighters were exchanged for 11 light helicopters and this acquisition became a strongly discussed affair during the mid-1990s. The burden of readiness squadron passed to the MiG-23s.

The new-era Air Force of the Czech Army was effectively formed on 1 July 1997 when the 3rd Corps of Tactical Aviation and the 4th Air Defence Corps were united. The members of both units have taken part in Alliance actions since the Czech Republic entered NATO on 12 March 1999. The Air Force began to revise and update its doctrines and aircraft and the acquisition of a new, western fighter was considered. MiG-23MFs were retired in 1994, MLs in 1998 and MiG-21s were reestablished as an interim type for what was supposed to be a transition period before buying a new fighter – which was determined to be the Swedish JAS 39 Gripen multi-role fighter aircraft. Because of the devastating floods that hit the country during 2002, the deal was deferred.

=== 2000s ===
A new international tender was issued for an interim solution. Gripen again won this tender among six different bidders as the Czech Republic accepted a government-to-government 10-year lease from Sweden that did not involve BAE Systems. Media allegations of BAE Systems kickbacks to decision makers during the original sales effort have led nowhere in judicial inquiries.

In 2006 Kateřina Hlavsová, became the first female jet aircraft pilot in modern Czech history and as of 2025, Hlavsová holds the rank of Major in the Czech Air Force.

In December 2008, the Czech Air Force wanted to train helicopter pilots for desert conditions for the upcoming mission in Afghanistan. Israel was the only country that was ready to help out, as it saw this as an opportunity to thank the Czech Republic for training Israeli pilots and supporting Israel when it first became a state.

The independence of the Czech Air Force was terminated on 1 December 2003 when the force became a part of newly established Joint Forces of the Czech Army with the command post located at Olomouc. Within the new structure the Air Force Commander-in-Chief was named as a Joint Forces Chief Commander Deputy.

=== 2010s ===
The Air Force operated within this structure until 30 June 2013. Within the framework of the reorganisation of the Army, on 1 July 2013 the independent High Command of the Czech Air Force (Czech: Velitelství vzdušných sil) was established, headquartered in Prague with new Commander in Chief Brigadier General Libor Štefánik. Former Joint Forces Command and Support Forces Command HQs were disbanded by 30 June 2013. With the Gripen contract due to expire in 2015, speculation mounted about whether that leasing agreement will be renewed or another type of fighter plane chosen. The Czech government expected a tender to be organised to provide a force of 18 supersonic fighters after 2015. The JAS 39 Gripen was generally accepted as the most effective option owing to the existing infrastructure, the availability of trained personnel and previous good operational experience. However, the background of the existing contract – specifically the broadly discussed issue of alleged corruption – prevented politicians from settling for this quick solution, favouring instead a general tender with more bidders offering such types as the F-16, F/A-18, F-15SE or F-35A.

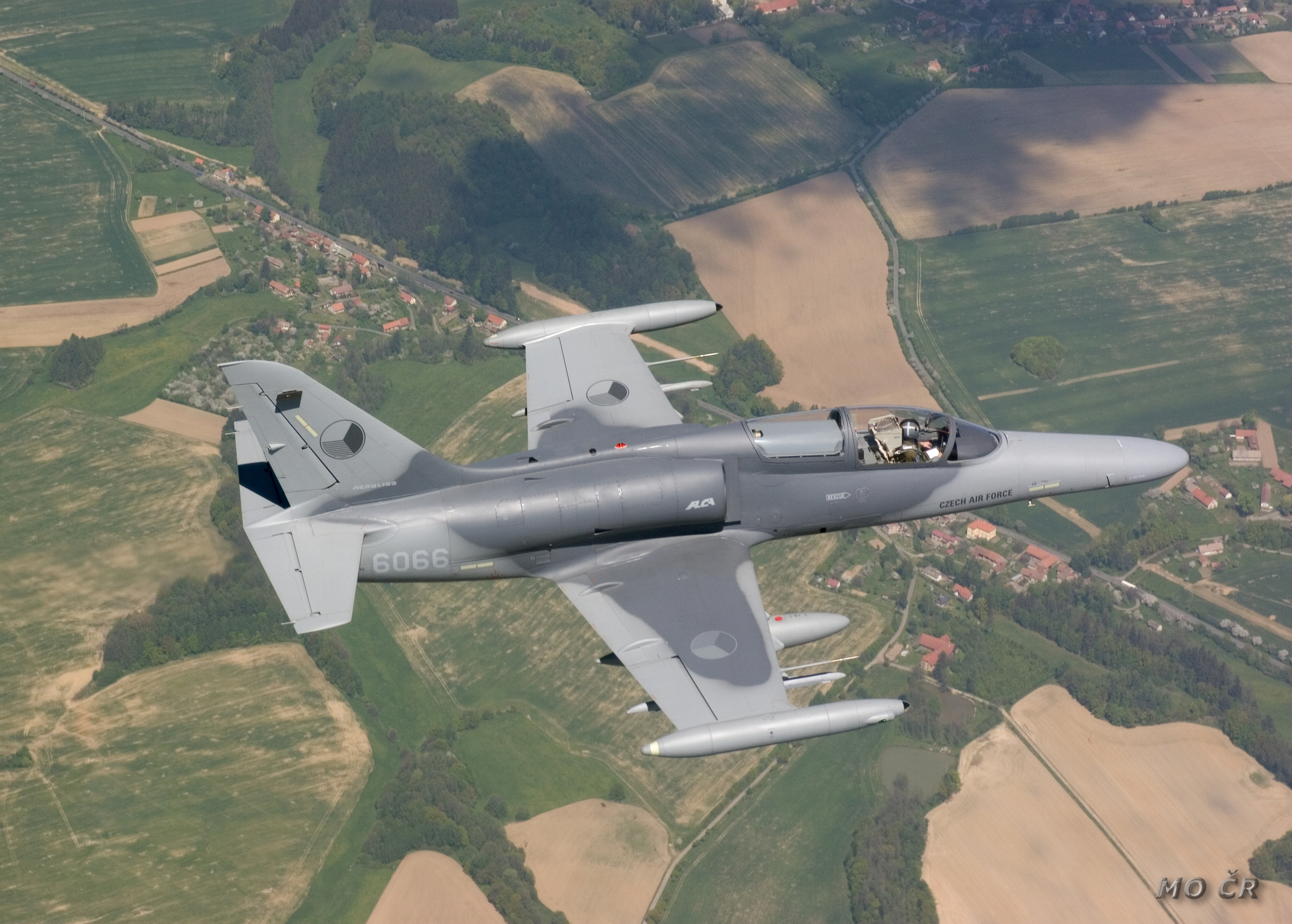
Aero Vodochody L-159A ALCA of the Czech Air Force

The creation of a non-supersonic air force has also been discussed as an option, owing to the perceived high costs and limited usefulness of keeping supersonic assets in a country surrounded by allied countries (all are European Union members and NATO members, except Austria). In this scenario the subsonic L-159 would become the backbone of the air force. The latest 2011 White Book clearly states that the supersonic fleet is to be continued for the protection of the Czech Republic and for co-operation within the NATO Integrated Air Defence System. Twelve single-seat and two twin-seat aircraft are viewed as sufficient for patrolling the Czech Republic, while 18 can support the sentry role in other NATO countries. A preliminary RFI requested 18 aircraft. The White Book specifies the 12+2 solution, requiring strategic requirements for the supersonic air force to be specified by November 2011.

On 16 May 2014, the director general of the Swedish defence and export agency FXM and the Czech deputy defence minister for defence acquisitions signed the "Annex prolonging agreement of lease of the JAS 39 Gripen aircraft", ensuring also the continuous upgrading and increasing the capabilities of these machines. The Swedish supersonic aircraft will equip the Czech Air Force until 2027 with an option for further two years.

Czech Defense Minister Martin Stropnický has unveiled plans to replace Soviet-designed military equipment with new weapons and to acquire helicopters and radars for the Czech Air Force, with tenders expected to be launched in 2015. In June 2019, the Czech Defence Minister submitted a contract to the government for the procurement of two C-295M transport aircraft to replace its Yakovlev Yak-40s. On 22 August 2019, Czech Prime Minister Andrej Babiš announced that the Czech Air Force had selected an offer from Bell Helicopter for eight UH-1Y Venom and four AH-1Z Viper helicopters. A contract for the helicopters was signed on 13 December 2019.

=== 2020s ===
In September 2020, both old Soviet Yak-40 transports were decommissioned in Kbely Air Force Base. In September 2021, the last small VIP transport plane CL-601 Challenger ended its service. In March 2022, it was removed from military air registry, and it is now one of the components of Military History Institute.

In September 2021, Czech Defense minister Lubomír Metnar signed contract with government of Israel for SPYDER Air Defense systems to replace old Soviet era 2K12M2 Kub (SA-6) systems. In April 2022, after Czech republic donated some of its Mi-24 helicopters to Ukraine as part of the military support, the US DoD decided to give additional 6 AH-1Z Viper and 2 UH-1Y Venom from their reserves as a gift to boost insufficient number of already ordered helicopters. They should be delivered after modernisation in 2026 and 2027. The first two AH-1Z arrived in July 2023 and both AH-1Z and UH-1Y helicopters were presented to public for the first time during the 2023 NATO Days in Ostrava. All of the 12 ordered helicopters is expected to be delivered before the end of first quarter of 2024.

In July 2022, Czech government selected F-35A Lightning II as a new fighter aircraft to enter service after lease of the JAS 39 ends in 2027. For that purpose minister of defence Jana Černochová was authorized to start negotiation on procurement of 24 fighters with the government of United States of America. On 27 September the Czech government approved the conditions of the contract for 24 F-35A that would be delivered from 2029 to 2033.

The Czech Air Force together with Polish Air Force protected the airspace of Slovakia from 1 September 2022, when the Slovak Air Force grounded its old MiG-29s and the term of delivery of the new F-16C fighters were postponed to 2024 until 28 October 2026 when Slovak F-16s took over Quick Reaction Alert duties.

== CzAF-NATO cooperation ==
Since the Czech Republic joined NATO, regular participation at a number of the Alliance's international exercises became a matter of course for the Czech Air Force. In 2009, the Czech Republic concluded an agreement regarding the cross-border collaboration and training with neighbouring Germany.

=== NATO Tiger Association ===
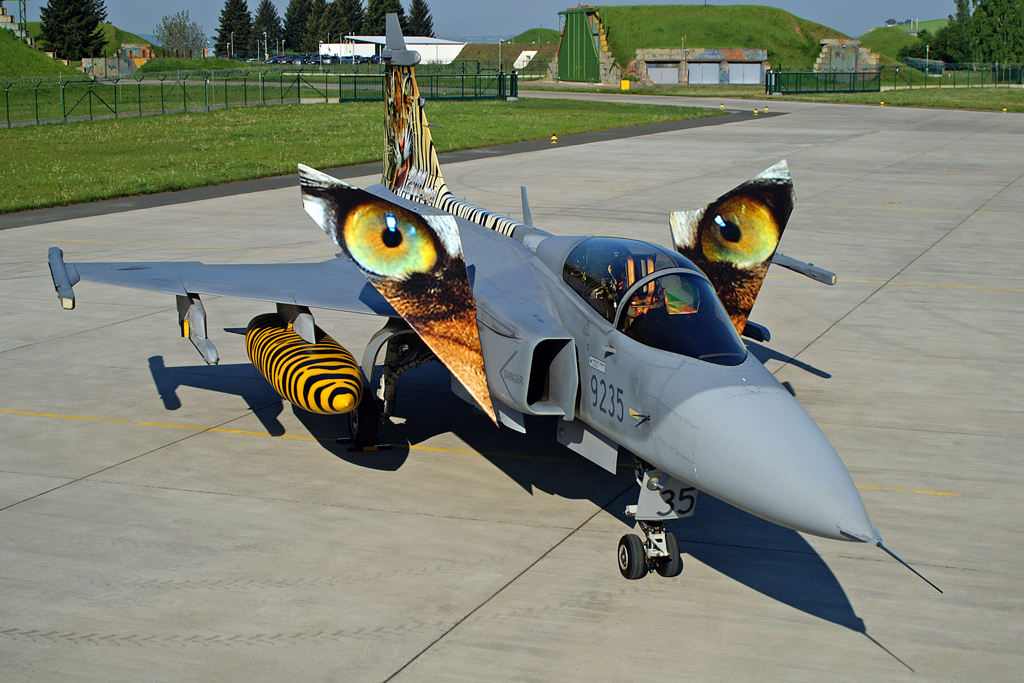
Gripen prepared for the Tiger Meet

In 2002, the NATO Tiger Meet was held at the Beja Air Base in Portugal. The 331st Helicopter Squadron was honored there by proclaiming it as a full member of the NATO Tiger Association. The squadron also received the most prestigious trophy, the Silver Tiger. With its new 221st Helicopter Squadron designation the unit continues, rejuvenated by new incoming members, in the Tiger tradition through today.

After the deployment of new JAS 39 Gripen fighters in 2005, four Gripens took part in the NATO Tiger Meet for the first time in 2008 at French Landivisiau. In 2010, the 211th Tactical Squadron was accepted as a full member of the NATO Tiger Association at Volkel Air Base, and the squadron was awarded a Silver Tiger Trophy.

=== AWACS ===
In 2011, the Czech Republic became the eighteenth country taking part in the NATO Airborne Early Warning and Control (NAEW&C) programme. Taking part in that international initiative means for Czech Air Force members an active participation in AWACS operations. A participation on the NAEW&C programme will cost the Czech Republic some 90 million CZK a year.

== Foreign deployments ==
=== Afghanistan ===
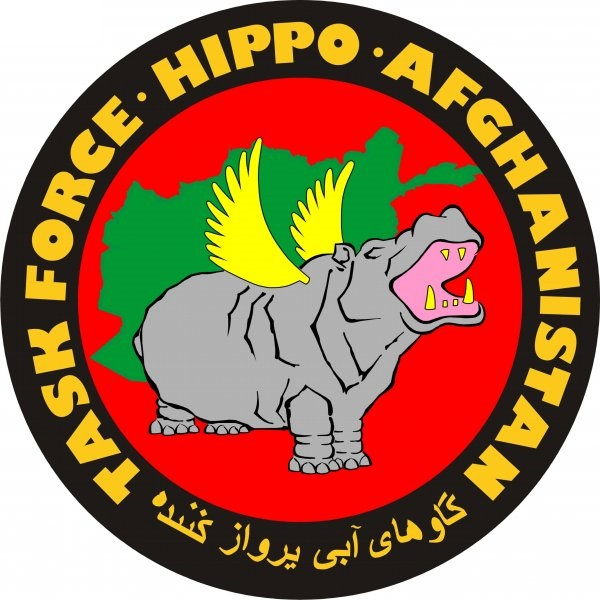
Emblem of the Task Force Hippo

In December 2009, Czech Air Force members started to build-up a rear for their new helicopter unit to be deployed in Afghanistan. After that the first three modernized Mi-171Sh helicopters armed for self-defense with PKM machine guns were air-transported to Afghanistan by Antonov An-124 Ruslan transport aircraft on 5 January 2010. To the FOB Sharana permanent forward operational base, all helicopters and unit members numbering 110 soldiers were flown on 17 January 2010. The Czech helicopter unit known as Task Force Hippo was ranged under Alliance Regional Command East. TF Hippo entered ISAF operations on 25 January 2010.

The first advisory group of the Czech Air Force was sent to Afghanistan in April 2008. Involved then there were members of the 231st of the time and the recent 221st Helicopter Squadron who have been tasked to participate in an establishment of the new Afghan National Army. As a part of the international Operational Mentoring and Liaison Team (OMLT) they started to work as instructors during training of Afghan Mi-24 attack helicopter crews and in the same way to train ground personnel.

A new Czech team was added to the deployment in 2010. The new Czech group consisted of pilots and technicians from the 243rd Helicopter Squadron, respectively from the 24th Transport Air Base at Prague-Kbely. The main task of Kbely AMT (Air Mentoring Team) section has been defined as air training of Afghan Mi-17/Mi-171 transport helicopter crews.

The Czech Republic also provided material help to Afghan Air Force which included supplies of aviation equipment – six Mi-17 transport helicopters and six Mi-24 attack helicopters. After selected helicopters underwent major overhauls and modernizations all have been presented to the Afghan National Army during the 2007–2009.

=== Baltics ===
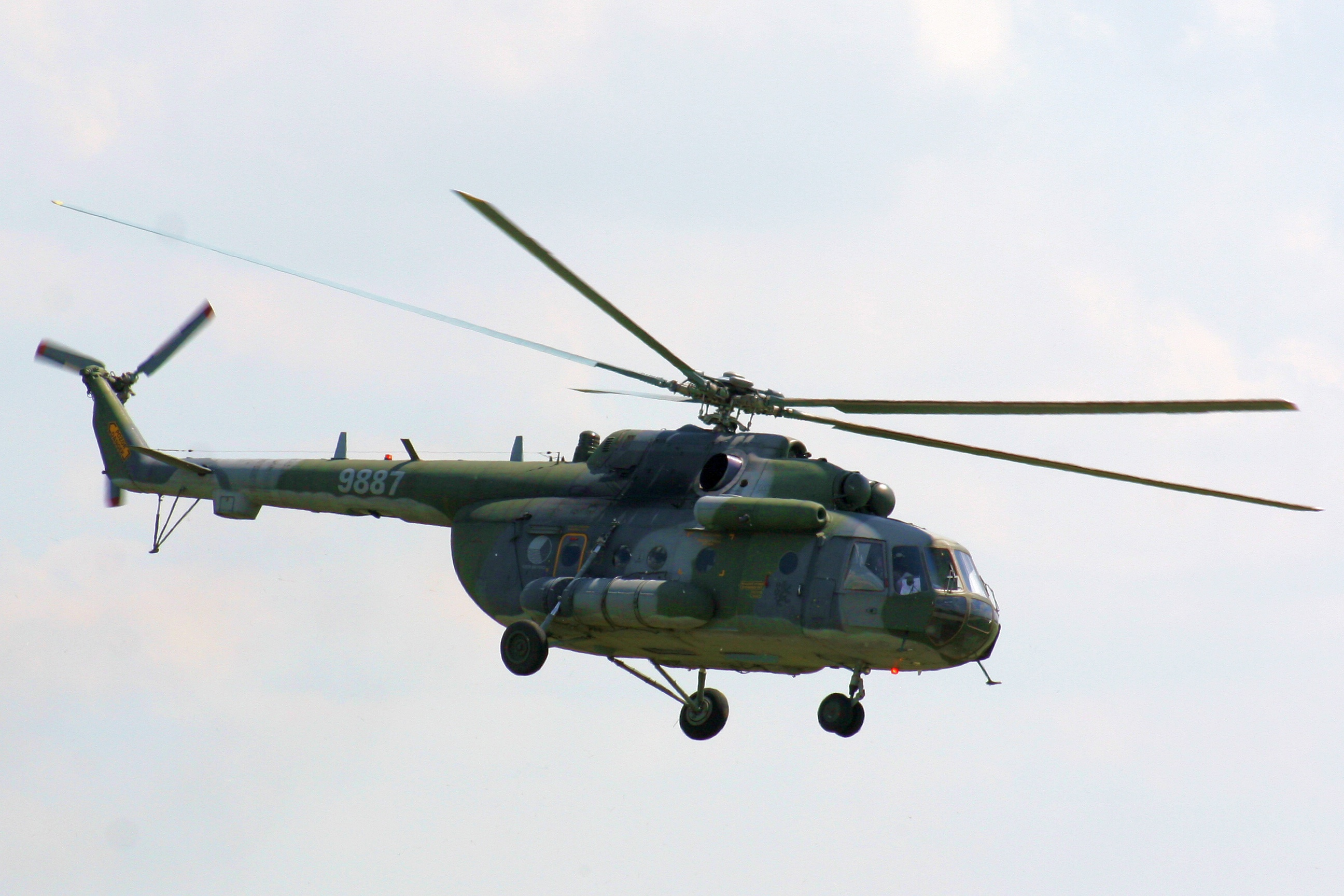
Mil Mi-171Sh of the Czech Air Force

The Czech Republic first joined the Baltic Air Policing (BAP) mission from 1 May until 31 August 2009 when a four-Gripen contingent was based in Baltic region. The second mission of the task force took place from 1 September 2012 until 4 January 2013. The main task of the Baltic Air Policing 2012 mission was to ensure protection of the airspace over the land and water territory of the three Baltic states – Latvia, Lithuania and Estonia. The whole mission was a part of NATINADS, operating from the Šiauliai Air Base in Lithuania. Remaining Czech Air Force Gripens were also in a 24/7 readiness on their home base at Čáslav. As in 2009, also during the 2012 Baltic mission the targets of Alpha scrambles were Russian military aircraft that failed to observe the flight rules of the civilian air corridors.

=== Sinai Peninsula ===
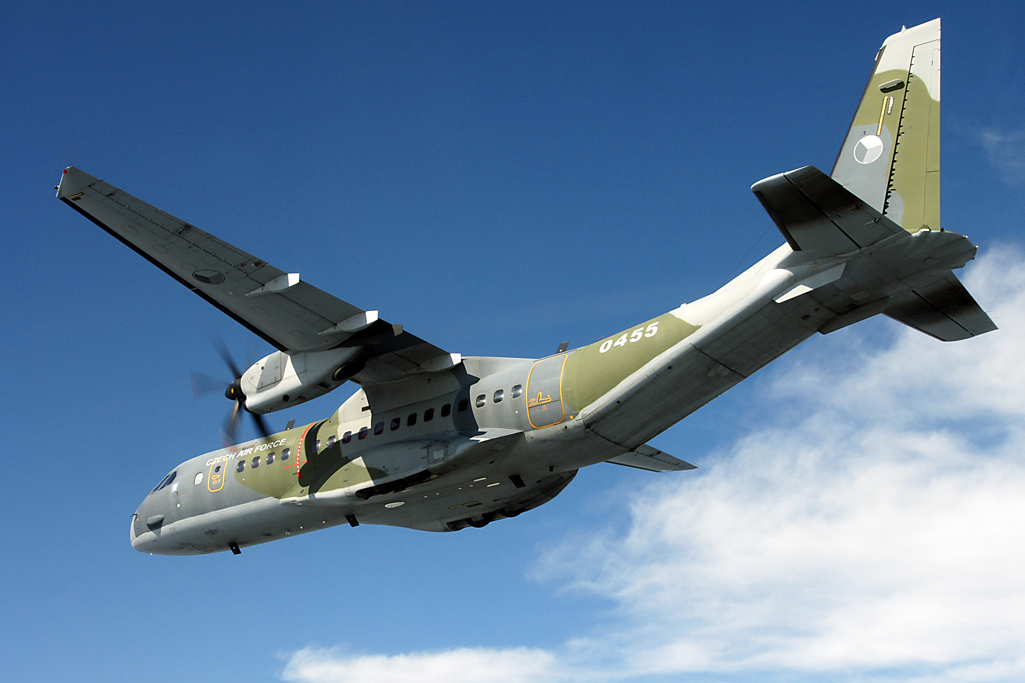
Czech Airbus C-295M

One of the most important tasks of the Czech military transport aviation in recent years is to provide support to the international Multinational Force and Observers (MFO) peace mission at the Sinai Peninsula. A small unit with one transport C-295M turboprop belonging to the equipment of the 24th Transport Air Base at Prague-Kbely has operated there since early November 2013 and contributes to the surveillance and monitoring the peace agreement between Egypt and Israel.

=== Ukraine ===
In relation to the 2014 Russian invasion of the Eastern Ukraine and occupation of Crimea the Government of the Czech Republic decided to provide help to the Ukrainian people. The first large-scale evacuation took place on 27 February 2014, when two aircraft departed the 24th Transport Air Base at Prague-Kbely for Kyiv, Ukraine. The A319CJ was fitted with two PTUs (Patient Transport Units) and two stretchers, the C-295M carried one PTU and 12 stretchers. The aircraft brought 27 Ukrainian citizens to the Czech Republic. Medical care was provided during the flight by a team of military medical personnel from the Centre of the aviation rescue service at Plzeň-Líně and from the Central Military Hospital in Prague. The second MEDEVAC mission took place on 6 March 2014, when one C-295M brought to the Czech Republic further 11 wounded persons.

== Structure ==
Czech Air Force locations 2026:
JAS 39C/D Gripen Helicopters Anti-Aircraft Missile unit
Command & Control RAT-31DL Radar Other sites

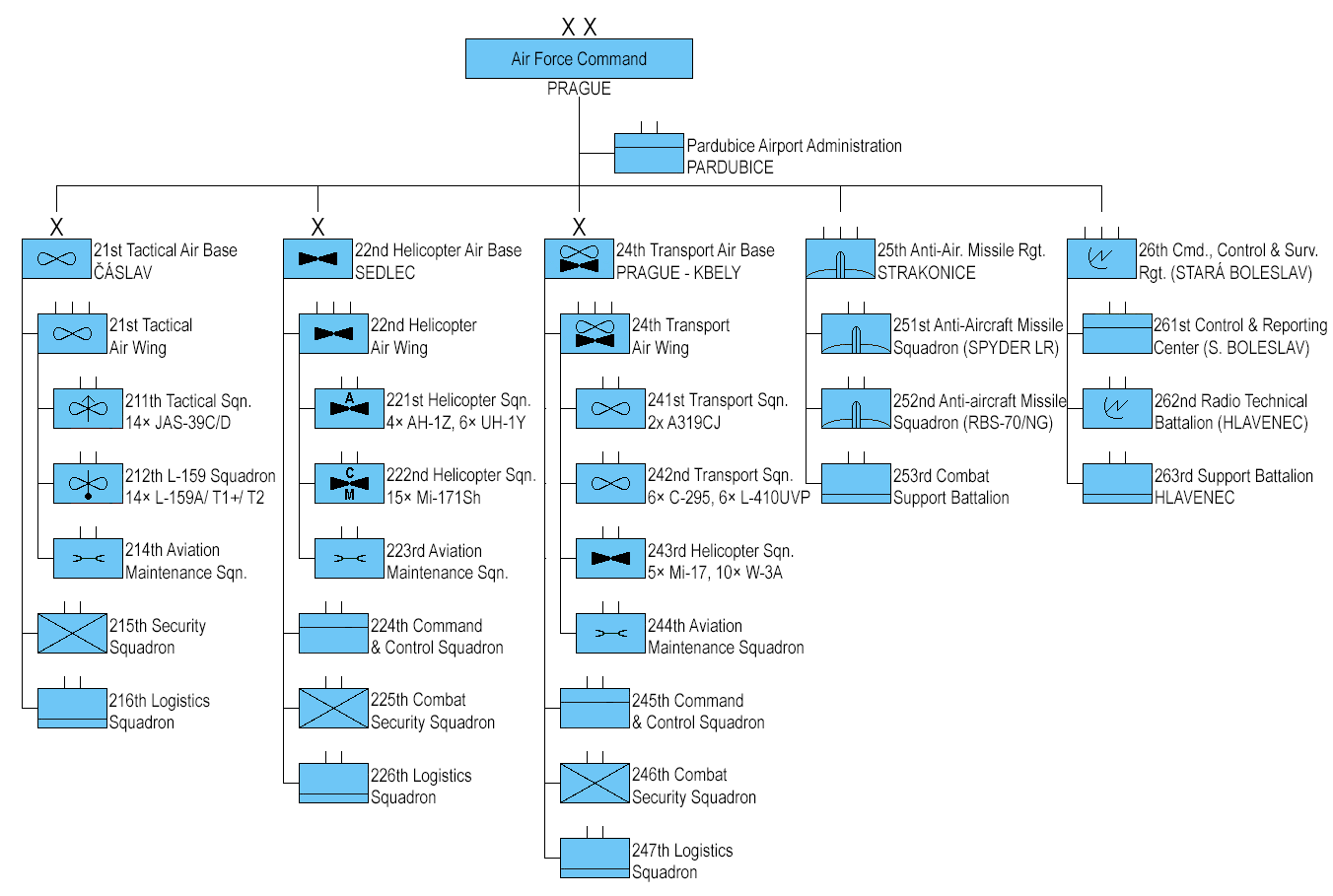
Air Force Command organization as of April 2026

The Czech Air Force consists of the following main units:

=== Czech Air Force Command ===
The Czech Air Force Command is a staff component based in the Czech Armed Forces General Staff compound in Prague.

==== Combat Forces ====
- 21st Tactical Air Force Base, in Čáslav
  - 21st Tactical Air Wing
    - 211th Tactical Squadron, with 14× JAS 39C/D Gripen
    - 212th Tactical Squadron, with 16× L-159A ALCA, 5x L-159T1+ ALCA, 3× L-159T2 ALCA
    - 214th Aviation Maintenance Squadron
  - 215th Security Squadron
  - 216th Logistics Squadron
- 22nd Helicopter Air Force Base, in Náměšť nad Oslavou
  - 22nd Helicopter Air Wing
    - 221st Helicopter Squadron, with 4× AH-1Z, 7× UH-1Y
    - 222nd Helicopter Squadron, with 15× Mi-171Sh
    - 223rd Aviation Maintenance Squadron
  - 224th Command and Control Squadron
  - 225th Combat Support Squadron
  - 226th Logistics Squadron

==== Combat Support Forces ====
- 24th Transport Air Force Base, in Prague-Kbely
  - 21st Transport Air Wing
    - 241st Transport Squadron, with 2× A319CJ
    - 242nd Transport and Special Squadron, with 4× Airbus C-295M, 2× Airbus C-295MW, 1x Embraer C-390 Millennium, 4× L-410UVP transport aircraft, and 2× L-410FG photogrammetric aircraft
    - 243rd Helicopter Squadron, with 5× Mi-17, 10× W-3A
    - 244th Aviation Maintenance Squadron
  - 245th Command and Control Squadron
  - 246th Combat Support Squadron
  - 247th Logistics Squadron
- 25th Anti-Aircraft Missile Regiment, in Strakonice
  - 251st Anti-Aircraft Missile Squadron, with SPYDER LR
  - 252nd Anti-Aircraft Missile Squadron, with RBS-70/NG
  - 253rd Combat Support Battalion
- 26th Command, Control and Surveillance Regiment, in Stará Boleslav
  - 261st Control and Reporting Center (CRC), in Hlavenec, reports to NATO's Integrated Air Defense System CAOC Uedem in Germany
  - 262nd Radio Technical Battalion, in Hlavenec
    - 1st Radio Technical Company, in Nepolisy, with RAT-31DL
    - 2nd Radio Technical Company, in Pomezí, with EL/M-2084 and RL-5M mobile radars
    - 3rd Radio Technical Company, in Stará Ves nad Ondřejnicí, with radars EL/M-2084 mobile radars
    - 4th Radio Technica Company, in Sokolnice, with RAT-31DL
    - 5th Radio Technica Company, in České Budějovice, with radars EL/M-2084
    - 6th Radio Technica Company, in Kříženec, with radars EL/M-2084 and RL-5M mobile radars
    - 7th Radio Technica Company, in Hrušovany, with EL/M-2084 mobile radars
  - 263rd Support Battalion, in Hlavenec
    - Force Protection Company
    - Reserve Control and Reporting Center, in Větrušice
    - Logistic Company
  - Radar Maintenance Center, in Olomouc
  - Prague Air Traffic Services Station, at Prague Airport

==== Combat Service Support unit ====
- Pardubice Airport Administration

== Training ==
Flight Training Center Pardubice with 1× EV-97, 8× Z-142CAF, 1× Zlin Z-142, 1× Zlin Z-43, 4x L-39 Skyfox, 1× L-410UVP, 8x Enstrom 480B and 6× Mi-17, is not formally a part of the Air Force. Primary flight training was outsourced as of 1 April 2004. CLV is a branch of LOM PRAHA s.p., state owned company controlled by the Ministry of Defence of the Czech Republic.

== Equipment ==
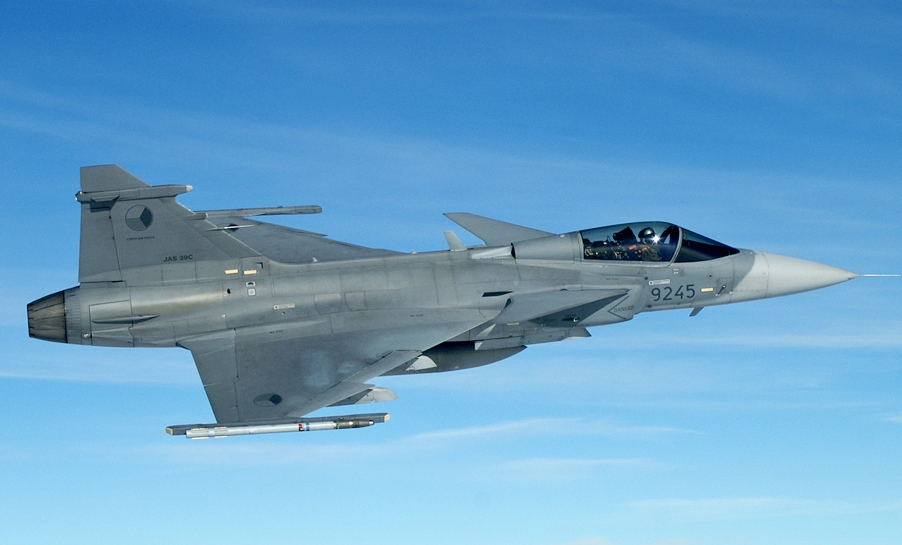
A JAS 39C Gripen at cruising altitude

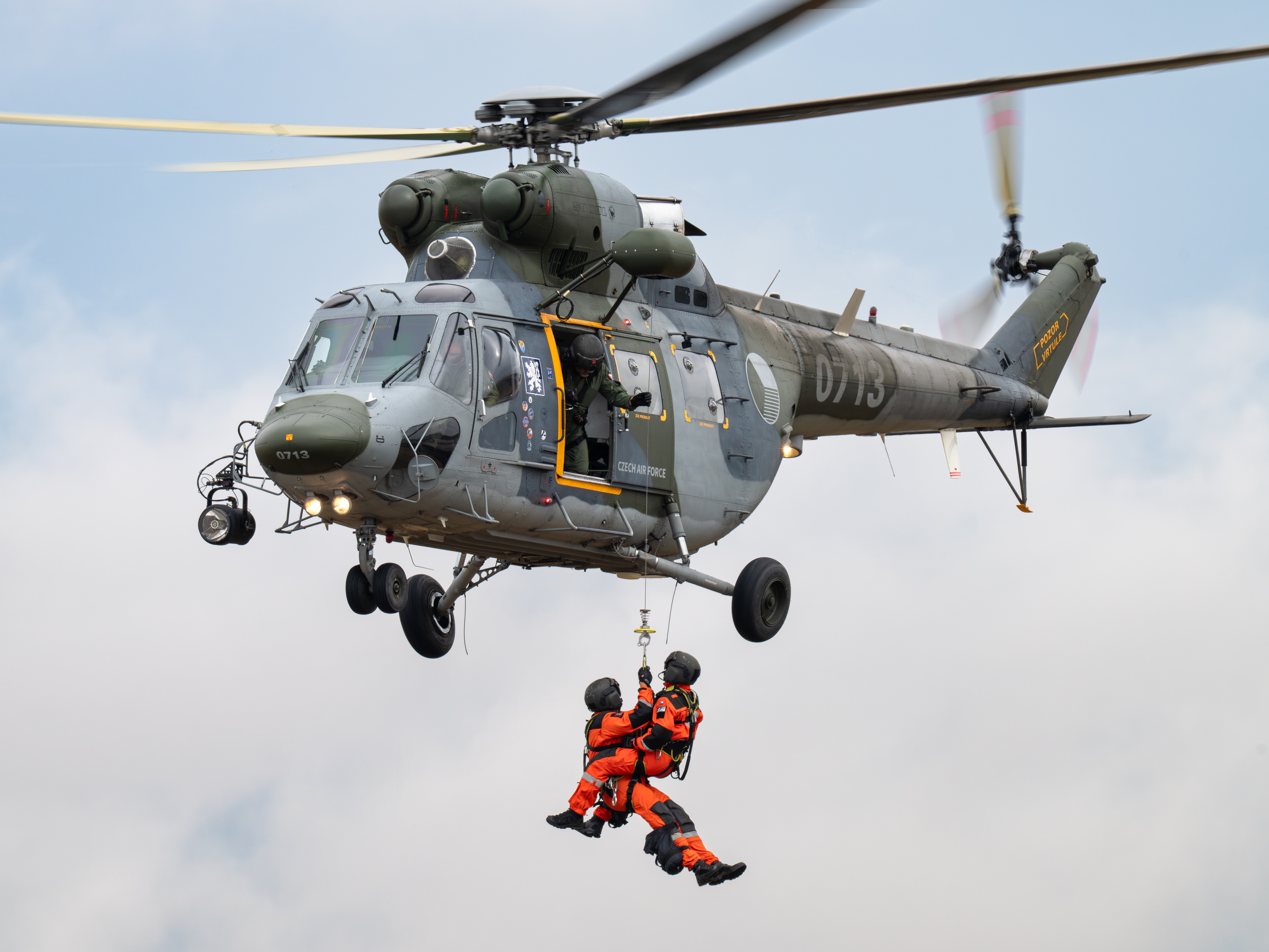
A W-3A Sokół performing a search and rescue demonstration.

=== Aircraft inventory ===
==== Current fleet ====
Aircraft	Origin	Role	Variant	In service	Notes
Combat aircraft
Saab JAS 39 Gripen	Sweden	Multirole fighter	JAS 39C	12	Leased from the Swedish Air Force.
Aero L-159	Czech Republic	Light attack aircraft	L-159A	16	(Note: 16 × L-159A (single-seat variant), they were refurbished and upgrades from 2020 to 2022.)
F-35 Lightning II	United States	Stealth multirole fighter	F-35A	0 (+24 on order)	Deliveries planned for the period 2029 - 2035.
Special mission aircraft
Let L-410 Turbolet	Czech Republic	Reconnaissance / surveillance / photographic mapping	L-410FG	2	Out of 6 Let L-410 , 2 are used for this mission.
Transport aircraft
Airbus A319	France / Germany	VIP transport	A319CJ	2	
Embraer C-390 Millennium	Brazil	Tactical airlifter	C390	1 (+1 on order)	Second delivery expected in 2027 or 2028.
Airbus C295	Spain	Tactical airlifter	C295M	4	(Note: Modernisation contract of the C295M to the C295MW variant signed in 2019. The modernisation is planned for the 2025-2028 period.)
Airbus C295	Spain	Tactical airlifter	C295MW	2	(Note: Two C-295MW ordered in 2019, an improved variant (winglet, improved engine, increased payload capacity).)
Let L-410	Czech Republic	Light tactical airlifter / utility aircraft	L-410UVP	4	
Helicopters
Bell AH-1 Viper	United States	Attack helicopter	AH-1Z	4 (+6 on order)	
Mil Mi-17	Soviet Union	Transport helicopter	–	3	(Note: Deep modernization in 2017–2020)
Mil Mi-17	Soviet Union	VIP transport	–	2	(Note: Two rebuilt and modified for passenger transport in 2023 as a partial replacement of previous VIP Mil Mi-8); Succeeding to the Mil-Mi-8. Total of 20 Mil Mi-17 / Mil-Mi 171.
Mil Mi-171	Russia	Utility helicopter	Mil Mi-171Sh	7	(Note: Mil Mi-171Sh: Manufactured between 2004 and 2006 as a repayment of old Soviet Union debt, helicopter variant with a rear ramp. It was upgraded twice: Upgraded to the NATO standards (5 in 2009, 2 in 2013).; Deep refurbishment between 2020 and 2026 (lifespan pushed to 2035).; It is equipped with 2 door gunners (2×Minigun M134D on a swing arm, or dismounted PKM), 1 rear ramp gunner, and an external fuel tank pods.); Total of 20 Mil Mi-17 / Mil-Mi 171.
Mil Mi-171	Russia	Utility helicopter	Mil Mi-171ShKM	8	(Note: Mil Mi-17#Export variants); Total of 20 Mil Mi-17 / Mil-Mi 171.
Bell UH-1 Venom	United States	Utility helicopter	UH-1Y	7 (+2 on order)	1 crashed on July 23, 2026.
PZL W-3 Sokół	Poland	Transport helicopter	W-3A	4	Planned to be retired in 2028. (Note: PZL W-3 Sokół received in 1995 in exchange for 10 MiG-29 from Poland.)
PZL W-3 Sokół	Poland	SAR	W-3A	6	Planned to be retired in 2028.
Trainer aircraft
Saab JAS 39 Gripen	Sweden	Conversion trainer	JAS 39D	2	Leased from the Swedish Air Force.
Aero L-159	Czech Republic	LiFT / advanced trainer	L-159T1+	3 (Note: 3× L-159T1+ two-seat trainers which were refurbished and upgraded from 2016 to 2019.)	Total of 8 Aero L-159 trainers.
Aero L-159	Czech Republic	LiFT / advanced trainer	L-159T2	5 (Note: 5× L-159T2 two-seat trainers which were manufactured between 2018 and 2020.)	Total of 8 Aero L-159 trainers.
Aero L-39 Skyfox	Czech Republic	Advanced trainer / basic trainer	L-39NG	4 (+4 on order)	Aircraft also known as the L-39NG (LOM Praha).

==== Potential future aircraft ====
Potential aircraft model	Origin	Role	Variant	Planned quantity	Notes
Helicopters
Boeing CH-47 Chinook	United States	Heavy lift helicopters	CH-47F	6	Successor of the Mil Mi-17 as planned in the CAFDC 2035. Order planned in 2030 - 2035.
AW-101	Italy / United Kingdom	Heavy lift helicopters	–	6	Successor of the Mil Mi-17 as planned in the CAFDC 2035. Order planned in 2030 - 2035.

=== Satellites ===
Satellite model	Origin	Type	Role	In service	Notes
Reconnaissance satellite
SATurnin-1	Czech Republic	LEO, CubeSat pototype	ISR	1	Launched into orbit in 2025.

=== Aircraft equipment ===
Model	Origin	Type	Variant	Used with	Notes
Cannons
Mauser BK-27	Germany	Revolver cannon (27×145mm)	–	JAS 39C / JAS 39D	
ZVI Plamen PL-20	Czech Republic	2 × cannon pod (20×102mm)	–	L-159A	
M197 electric cannon	United States	Rotary cannon (20×102mm)	–	AH-1Z	
Air-to-air missiles
AIM-120 AMRAAM	United States / Norway	BVR, radar homing, air-to-air missile Beyond-visual-range	AIM-120C-5	JAS 39C / JAS 39D	
AIM-9 Sidewinder	United States	Short range, infrared homing, air-to-air missile	AIM-9L	L-159A	
AIM-9 Sidewinder	United States	Short range, infrared homing, air-to-air missile	AIM-9M	JAS 39C / JAS 39D / L-159A	
Air-to-ground missiles
AGM-65 Maverick	United States	Air-to-ground tactical missile (dual EO/IR guidance system) (close air support missile)	AGM-65B	JAS 39C / JAS 39D / L-159A	
AGM-114 Hellfire	United States	Anti-tank guided missile	–	AH-1Z	
Guided bombs
GBU-12 Paveway II	United States	General-purpose, laser-guided bomb 500 lb (230 kg)	–	L-159A	Munition: Mk 82 500 lb (230 kg).
GBU-16 Paveway II	United States	General-purpose, laser-guided bomb 1,000 lb (450 kg)	–	L-159A	Munition: Mark 83 1,000 lb (450 kg).
Rockets
CRV7	Canada	Unguided rockets / rocket pods	–	L-159A	Launched from: LAU-5002 rocket pod (6 × 70mm); LAU-5003 rocket pod (19 × 70mm)
Hydra 70	United States	Unguided rockets / rocket pods (70 mm)	–	AH-1Z/ UH-1Y	
APKWS	United States	Guided rocket kits for Hydra 70 (70mm)	–	AH-1Z/ UH-1Y	
Small arms
FN M3P	Belgium	Pintle-mounted, door machine gun (12.7×99mm NATO)	GAU-21A	UH-1Y	(Left side)
PKM	USSR	Door machine gun (7.62×54mmR)	–	Mil Mi-171Sh / Mil Mi-171ShKM	(Dismounted - for close perimeter protection while doorgunner is outside)
M134 Minigun	United States	Rotary, pintle-mounted, door machine gun (7.62×51mm NATO)	M134D-H	UH-1Y / Mil Mi-171Sh / Mil Mi-171ShKM	
M240	Belgium / United States	Pintle-mounted, door machine gun (7.62×51mm NATO)	M240D	UH-1Y	(Right side)
Pods
Rafael Litening 4	Israel	Targeting pod / reconnaissance pod	Litening 4i	JAS 39C / JAS 39D	
Laser guidance	United States	Laser targeting system	–	AH-1Z	The AH-1Z can be used as a JTAC platform for the L-159A attacks.
Helicopter fuel pods	USSR	External fuel tanks	–	Mil Mi-171Sh / Mil Mi-171ShKM	

== Bibliography ==
- Brown, Alan Clifford. The Czechoslovak Air Force in Britain, 1940–1945 (PhD Thesis). University of Southampton, Faculty of Arts, School of Humanities, 1998, 237 pages.
- Cejka, Zdenek (August 2001). "Courrier des Lecteurs" [Readers' Letters]. Avions: Toute l'Aéronautique et son histoire (in French) (101): 2. ISSN 1243-8650.
- Cejka, Zdenek (January 2001). "Les Nieuport Techécoslovaques" [The Czech Nieuports]. Avions: Toute l'Aéronautique et son histoire (in French) (94): 38–47. ISSN 1243-8650.
- Cejka, Zdenek (February 2001). "Les Nieuport Techécoslovaques". Avions: Toute l'Aéronautique et son histoire (in French) (95): 42–47. ISSN 1243-8650.
- Hájková, Leona (2023). Czech Air Force (1st ed.). Prague: Ministry of Defence of the Czech Republic – Military History Institute Prague. ISBN 978-80-7278-860-6.
- Kudlicka, Bohumir (August 2001). "Des avions français en Tchécoslovaquie: les unités de chasse sur Spad" [French Aircraft in Czechoslovakia: The Fighter Units with Spads]. Avions: Toute l'Aéronautique et son histoire (in French) (101): 52–56. ISSN 1243-8650.
- Kudlicka, Bohumir & Cony, Christophe (April 2001). "Des avions français en Tchéchoslovaquie" [French Aircraft in Czechoslovakia]. Avions: Toute l'Aéronautique et son histoire (in French) (97): 47–49. ISSN 1243-8650.
- Titz, Zdenek; Davies, Gordon and Ward, Richard. Czechoslovakian Air Force, 1918–1970 (Aircam Aviation Series no. S5). Reading, Berkshire, UK: Osprey Publishing Ltd., 1971. ISBN 0-85045-021-7.
