= Vysočany (disambiguation) =

Vysočany is a district of Prague, Czech Republic.

Vysočany may also refer to places:

== Czech Republic ==
- Vysočany (Blansko District), a municipality and village in the South Moravian Region
- Vysočany (Znojmo District), a municipality and village in the South Moravian Region
- Vysočany, a village and part of Bor (Tachov District) in the South Bohemian Region
- Vysočany (Hrušovany), a hamlet and part of Hrušovany in the Ústí nad Labem Region
- Vysočany, a village and part of Manětín in the Plzeň Region
- Vysočany, a village and part of Nový Bydžov in the Hradec Králové Region

== Slovakia ==
- Vysočany (Bánovce nad Bebravou District), a municipality and village in the Trenčín Region
