= Hlavenec =

- Municipality
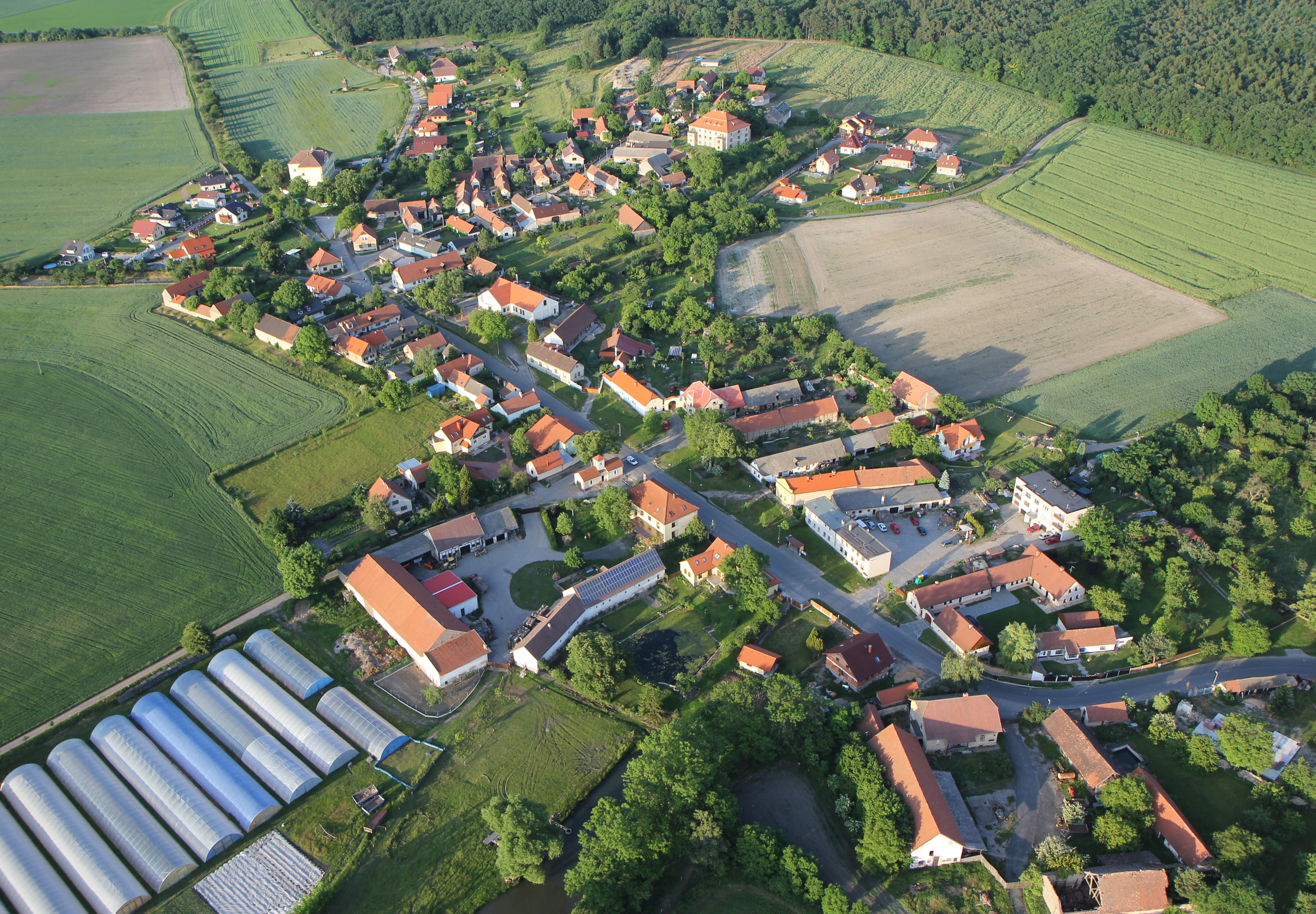
- Aerial view

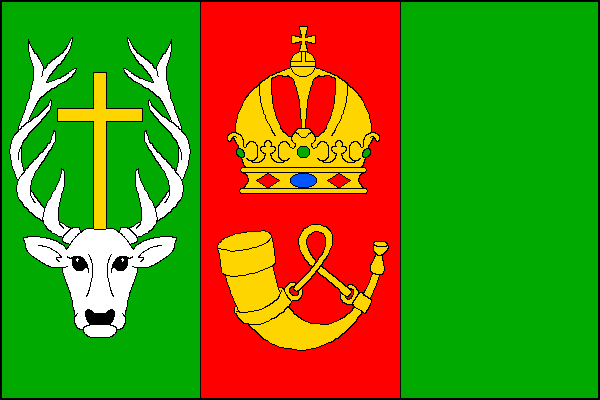
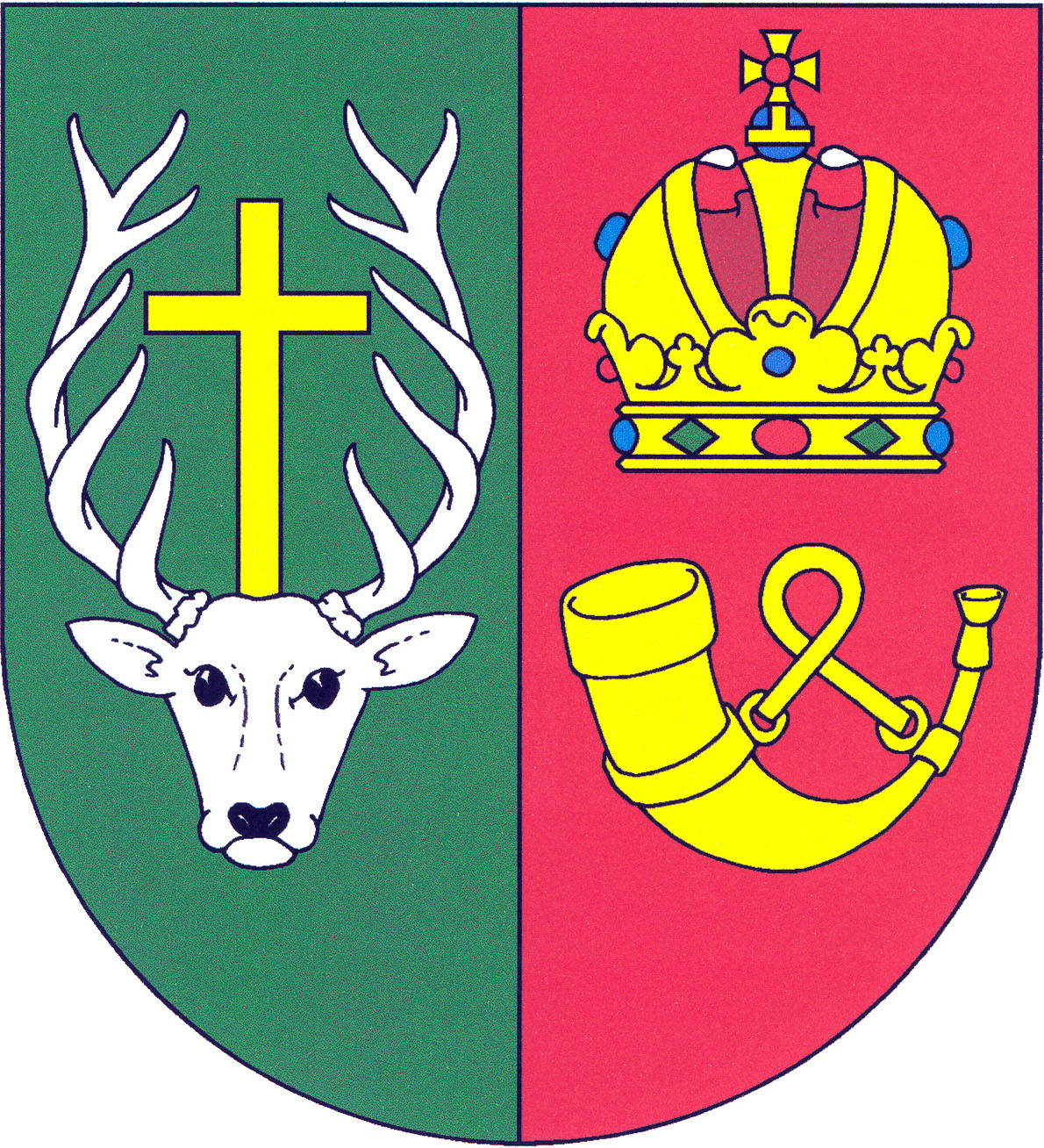
- Flag Coat of arms

- Location in the Czech Republic
- Coordinates: 50°14′18″N 14°42′7″E
- Country: Czech Republic
- Region: Central Bohemian
- District: Prague-East
- First mentioned: 1386

Area
  - Total: 14.72 km^{2} (5.68 sq mi)
- Elevation: 195 m (640 ft)

Population (2026-01-01)
  - Total: 414
  - Density: 28.1/km^{2} (72.8/sq mi)
- Time zone: UTC+1 (CET)
  - Summer (DST): UTC+2 (CEST)
- Postal code: 294 74
- Website: www.hlavenec.cz

Hlavenec is a municipality and village in Prague-East District in the Central Bohemian Region of the Czech Republic. It has about 400 inhabitants.

== Etymology ==
The name is a diminutive form of the personal name Hlaven.

== Geography ==
Hlavenec is located about 19 kilometres (12 mi) northeast of Prague. It lies in a flat landscape in the Polabí lowlands, on the border between the Jizera Table and Central Elbe Table. The highest point is the hill Kobylí hlava at 215 m (705 ft) above sea level.

== History ==
The first written mention of Hlavenec is from 1386. It was probably founded together with Kostelní Hlavno and Sudovo Hlavno. The village was owned by the Lords of Michalovice and later was annexed to the Brandýs estate. In 1547, the estate was acquired by the Habsburg family and Hlavenec became known for the imperial game park.

== Demographics ==
Historical population

Year	Pop.	±%
1869	382	—
1880	412	+7.9%
1890	406	−1.5%
1900	439	+8.1%
1910	457	+4.1%

Year	Pop.	±%
1921	466	+2.0%
1930	440	−5.6%
1950	377	−14.3%
1961	362	−4.0%
1970	284	−21.5%

Year	Pop.	±%
1980	274	−3.5%
1991	277	+1.1%
2001	311	+12.3%
2011	373	+19.9%
2021	434	+16.4%

Source: Censuses

== Transport ==
The D10 motorway from Prague to Turnov runs along the eastern municipal border.

== Sights ==
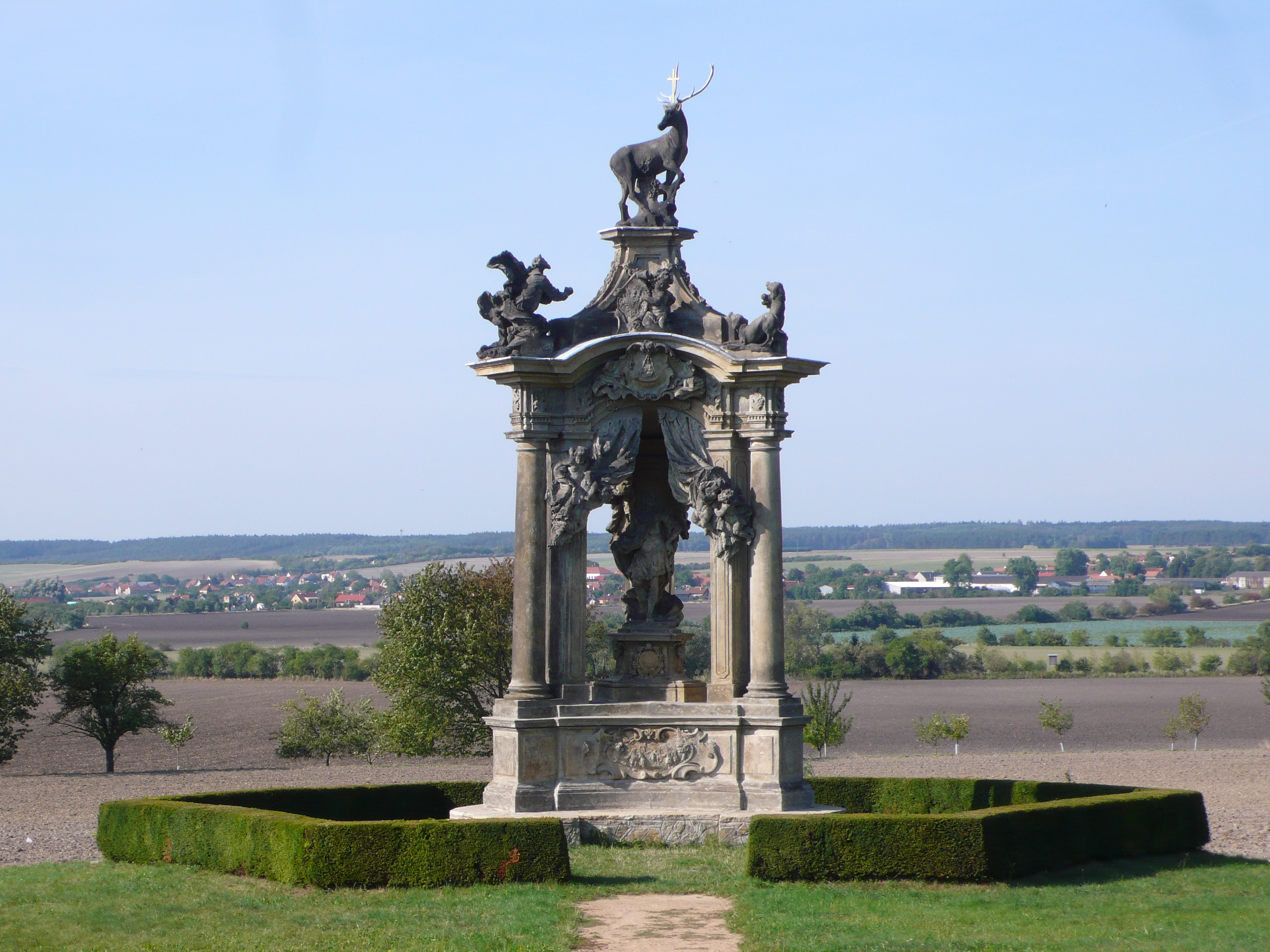
Charles VI memorial

The most important monument is the memorial of Emperor Charles VI. It was made by Matthias Braun in 1724–1725 according to the design by František Maxmilián Kaňka.
