= Vysočany (Hrušovany) =

- Hamlet
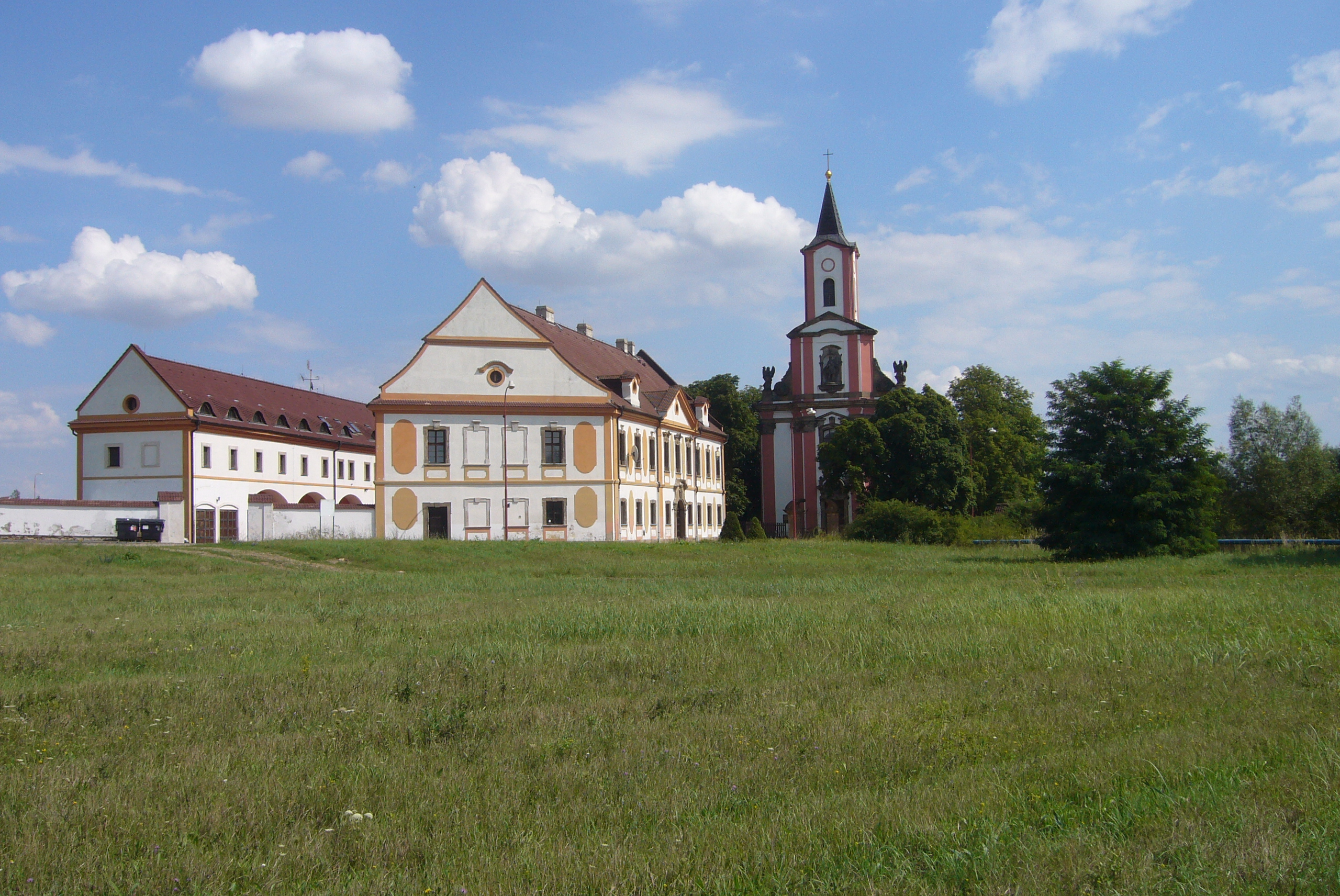
- Church of Saint Wenceslaus

- Location within Czech Republic
- Coordinates: 50°23′24″N 13°31′41″E
- Country: Czech Republic
- Region: Ústí nad Labem
- District: Chomutov
- Municipality: Hrušovany

Area
  - Total: 4.95 km^{2} (1.91 sq mi)
- Elevation: 300 m (980 ft)

Population (2021)
  - Total: 2
  - Density: 0.40/km^{2} (1.0/sq mi)
- Time zone: UTC+1 (CET)
  - Summer (DST): UTC+2 (CEST)
- Postal code: 431 43

Vysočany is a hamlet and administrative part of Hrušovany in Chomutov District in the Ústí nad Labem Region of the Czech Republic.
