= Líně =

- Municipality
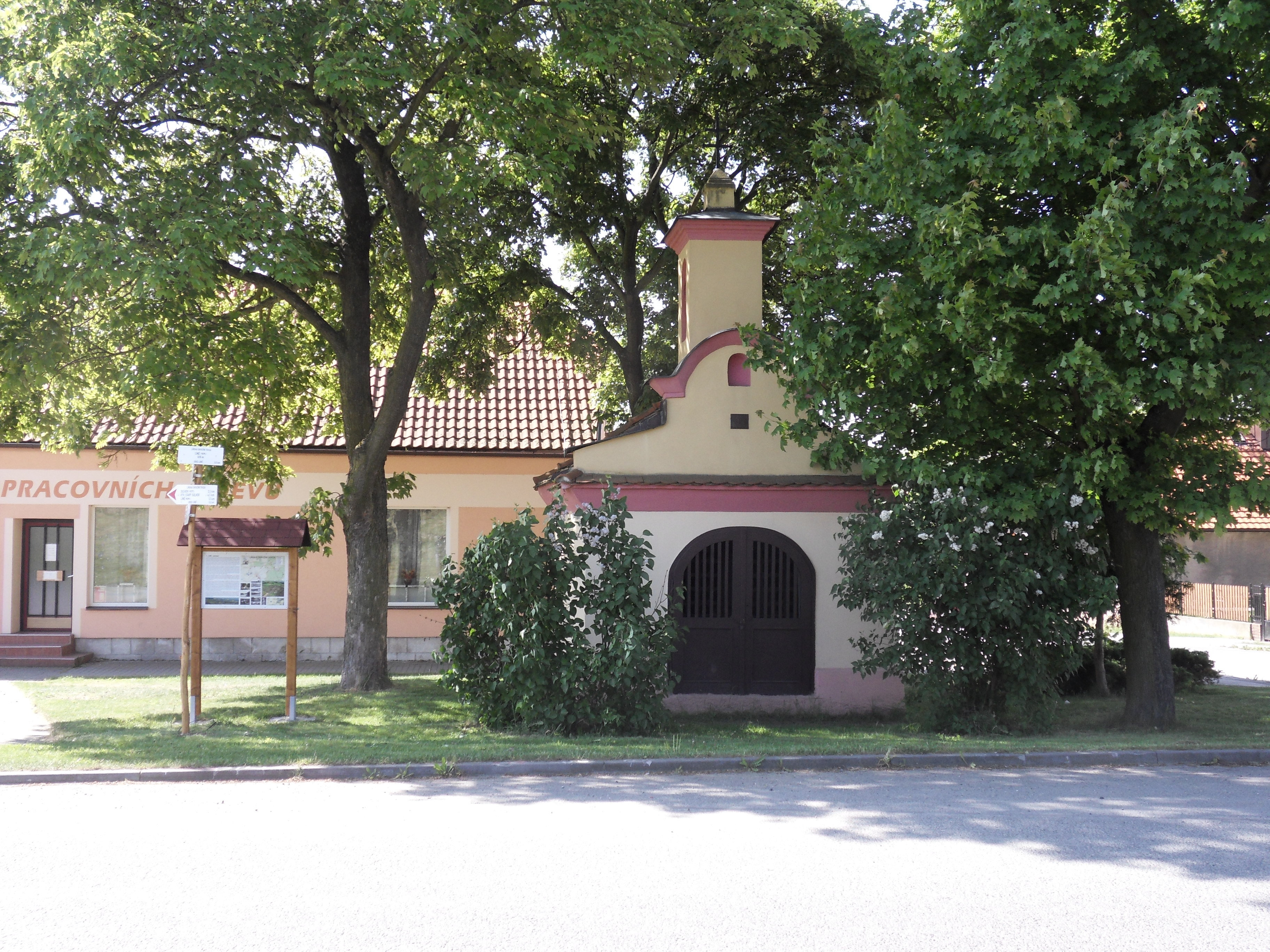
- Chapel of Saint Wenceslaus

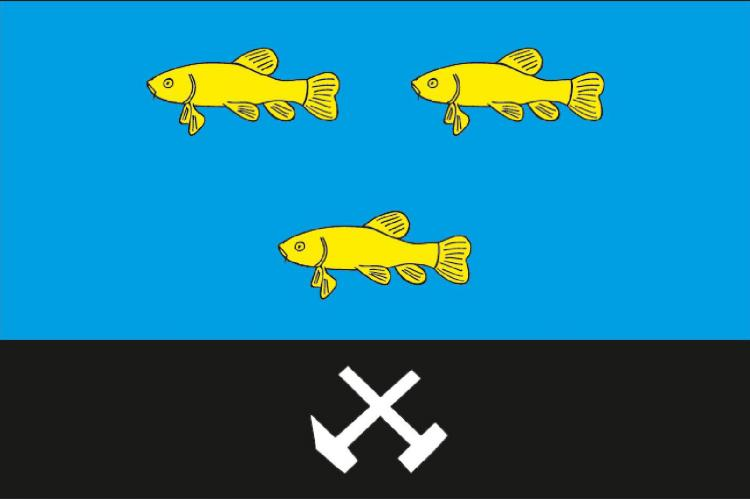
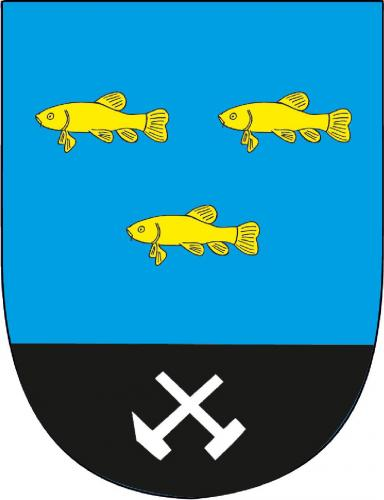
- Flag Coat of arms

- Location in the Czech Republic
- Coordinates: 49°41′41″N 13°15′24″E
- Country: Czech Republic
- Region: Plzeň
- District: Plzeň-North
- First mentioned: 1115

Area
  - Total: 10.23 km^{2} (3.95 sq mi)
- Elevation: 328 m (1,076 ft)

Population (2026-01-01)
  - Total: 2,879
  - Density: 281.4/km^{2} (728.9/sq mi)
- Time zone: UTC+1 (CET)
  - Summer (DST): UTC+2 (CEST)
- Postal code: 330 21
- Website: www.obec-line.cz

Líně is a municipality and village in Plzeň-North District in the Plzeň Region of the Czech Republic. It has about 2,900 inhabitants.

== Etymology ==
The name of the village is derived from the Czech word líný, i.e. 'lazy'. Either this village belonged to a person with this trait, or this trait was attributed to all the inhabitants of the village.

== Geography ==
Líně is located about 9 kilometres (6 mi) southwest of Plzeň. It lies in the Plasy Uplands. The highest point is the flat hill Ke Lhotě at 364 m (1,194 ft) above sea level.

== History ==
The first written mention of Líně is from 1115. For centuries it was a farming village. In the 19th century, it was connected with coal mining.

== Demographics ==
Historical population

Year	Pop.	±%
1869	379	—
1880	1,063	+180.5%
1890	1,529	+43.8%
1900	1,875	+22.6%
1910	2,465	+31.5%

Year	Pop.	±%
1921	3,127	+26.9%
1930	3,204	+2.5%
1950	2,499	−22.0%
1961	3,068	+22.8%
1970	2,626	−14.4%

Year	Pop.	±%
1980	2,475	−5.8%
1991	2,224	−10.1%
2001	2,239	+0.7%
2011	2,420	+8.1%
2021	2,786	+15.1%

Source: Censuses

== Economy ==
The largest employer in Líně is a branch of the Gühring company. It is a manufacturer of rotating tools for metal processing.

== Transport ==
The D5 motorway from Plzeň to the Czech–German border in Rozvadov runs through the municipal territory.

A part of the Plzeň Líně Airport is located in the municipal territory (ICAO: LKLN). It is a public domestic and private international airport. The airport was used as a base for the Soviet 6th Guards Fighter Aviation Division during Warsaw Pact invasion of Czechoslovakia between 21 August and 10 November 1968.

== Sights ==
The only protected cultural monument in the municipality is the Chapel of Saint Wenceslaus. It dates from the first half of the 19th century.
