= Čeradice =

- Municipality
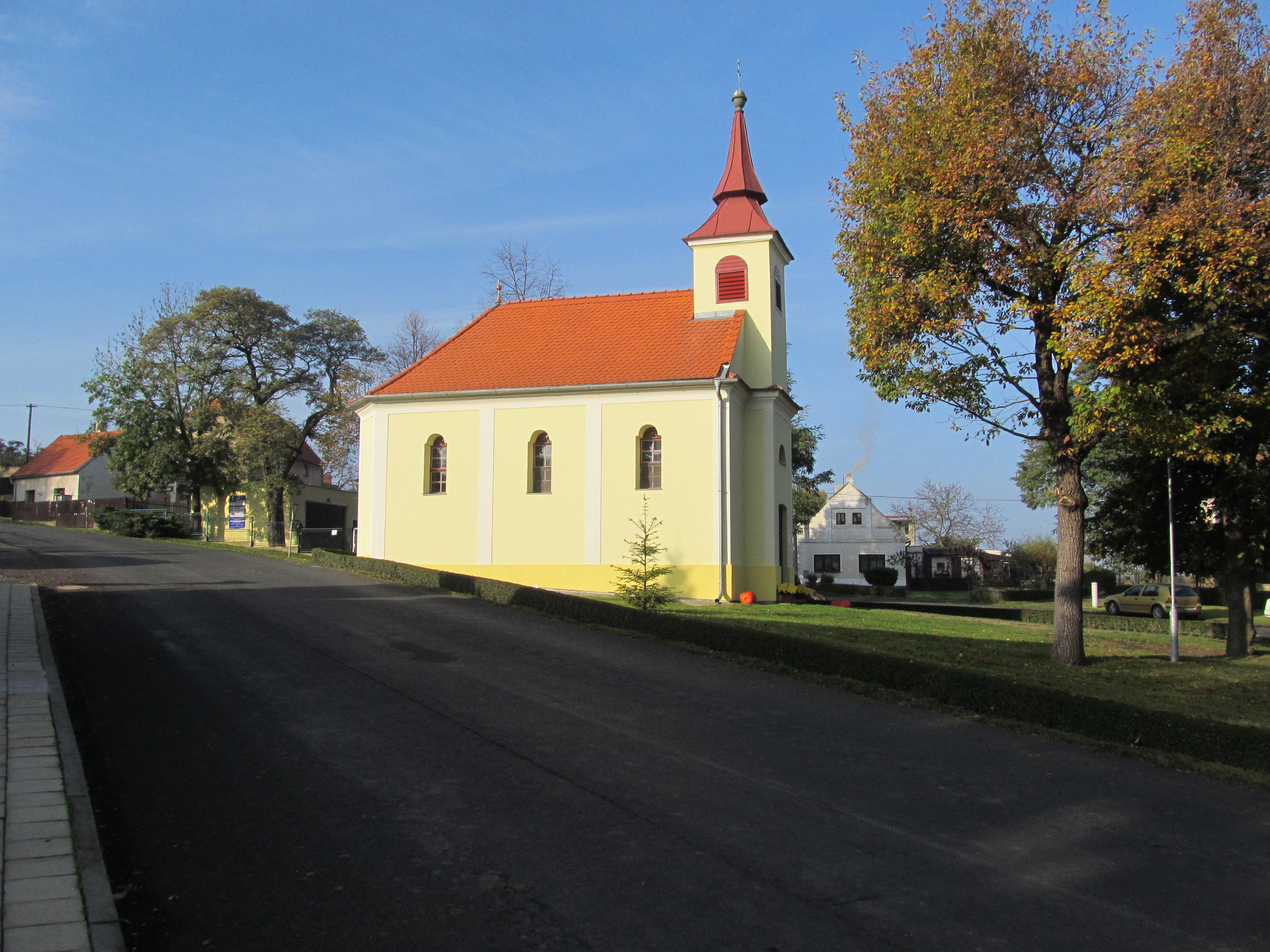
- Chapel of the Holy Guardian Angels

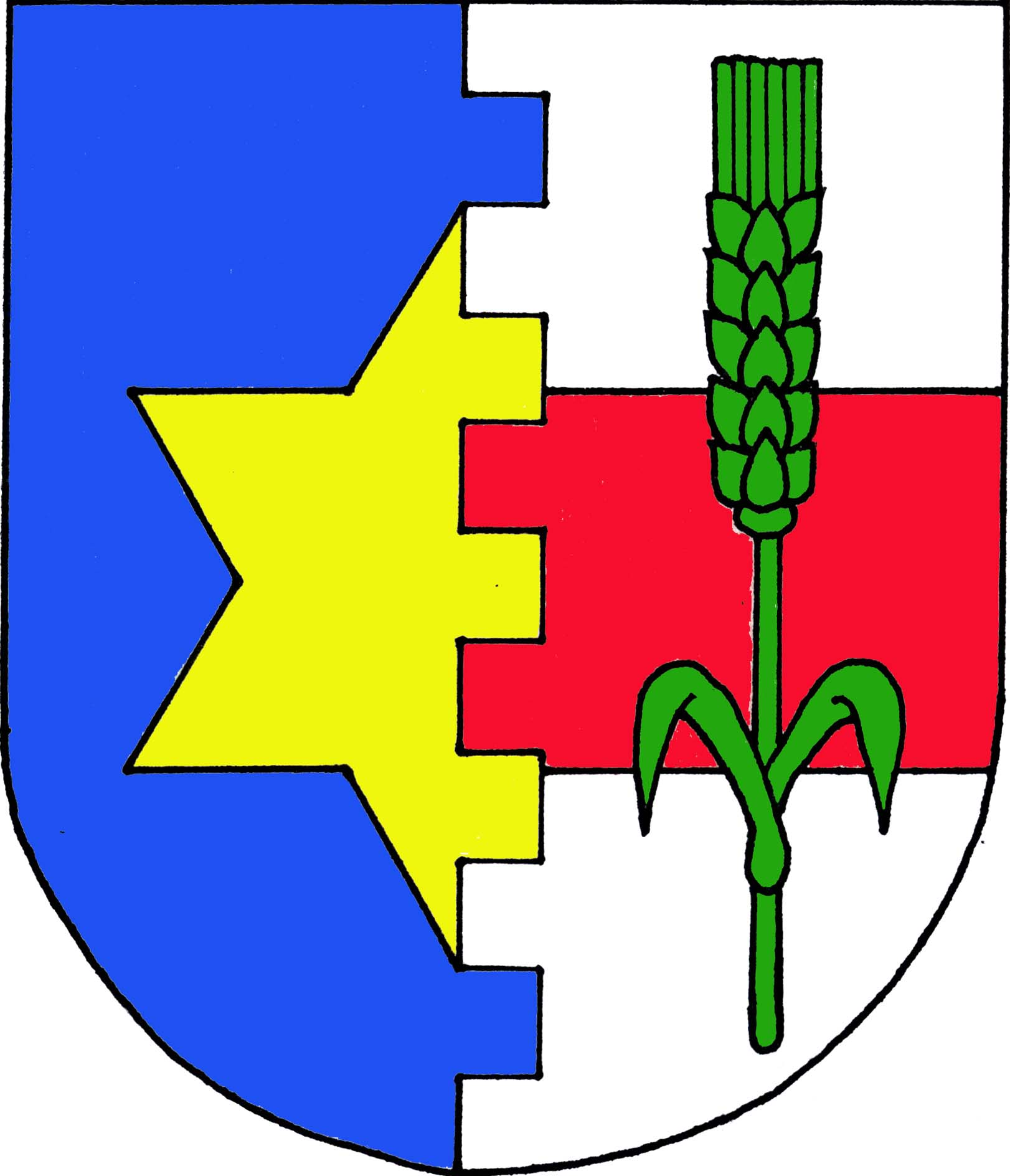
- Flag Coat of arms

- Location in the Czech Republic
- Coordinates: 50°18′32″N 13°29′38″E
- Country: Czech Republic
- Region: Ústí nad Labem
- District: Louny
- First mentioned: 1115

Area
  - Total: 12.65 km^{2} (4.88 sq mi)
- Elevation: 300 m (980 ft)

Population (2026-01-01)
  - Total: 303
  - Density: 24.0/km^{2} (62.0/sq mi)
- Time zone: UTC+1 (CET)
  - Summer (DST): UTC+2 (CEST)
- Postal code: 438 01
- Website: www.ceradice.cz

Čeradice (German: Tscheraditz) is a municipality and village in Louny District in the Ústí nad Labem Region of the Czech Republic. It has about 300 inhabitants.

Čeradice lies approximately 24 kilometres (15 mi) west of Louny, 57 km (35 mi) south-west of Ústí nad Labem, and 72 km (45 mi) west of Prague.

== Administrative division ==
Čeradice consists of three municipal parts (in brackets population according to the 2021 census):

- Čeradice (273)
- Kličín (16)
- Větrušice (13)

== Demographics ==
Historical population
Year	Pop.	±%
1869	694	—
1880	759	+9.4%
1890	747	−1.6%
1900	794	+6.3%
1910	804	+1.3%
1921	812	+1.0%
1930	818	+0.7%
1950	391	−52.2%
1961	356	−9.0%
1970	296	−16.9%
1980	261	−11.8%
1991	233	−10.7%
2001	245	+5.2%
2011	286	+16.7%
2021	302	+5.6%
Source: Censuses
