= Kostelní Hlavno =

- Municipality
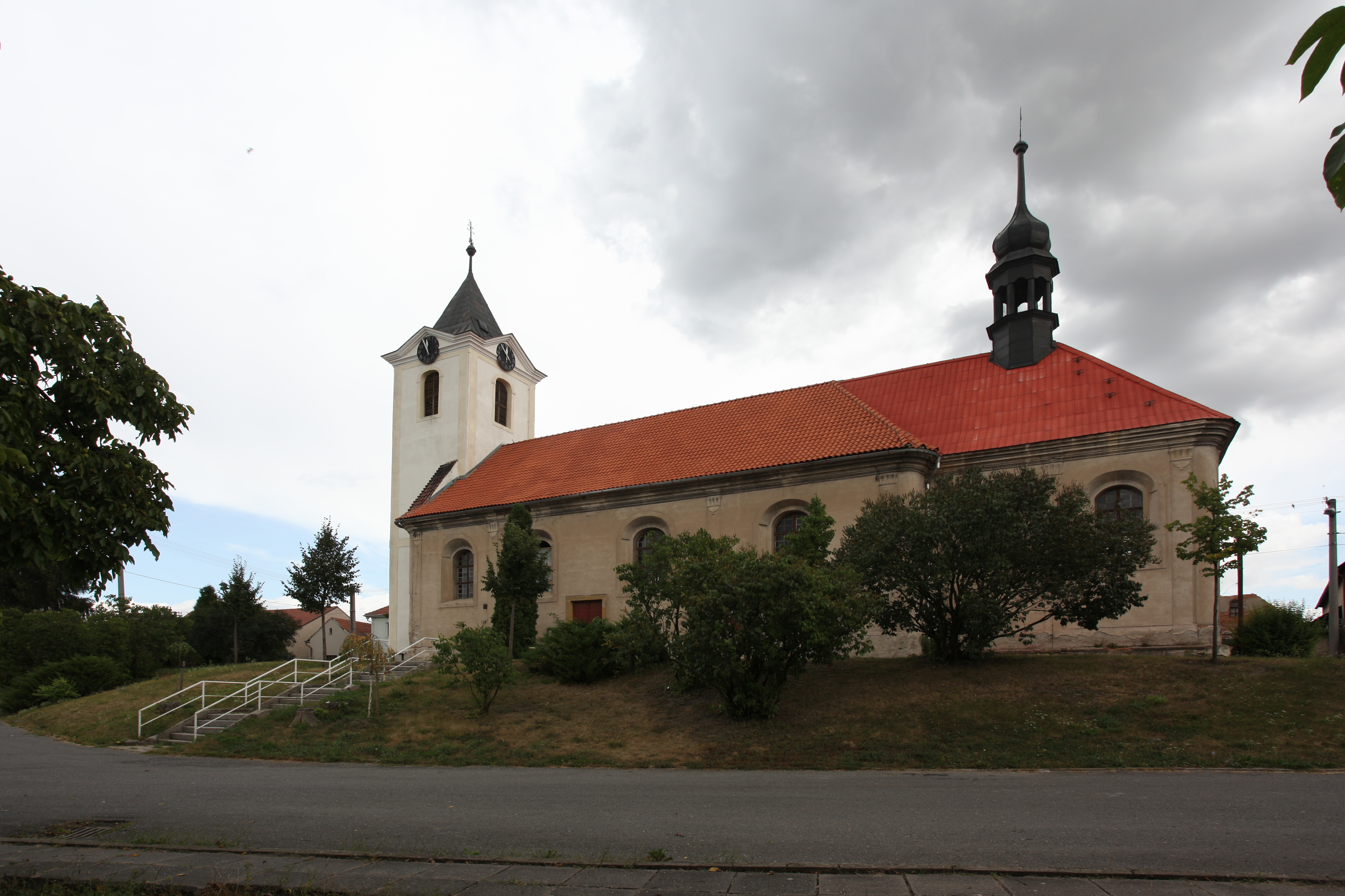
- Church of Saint Peter

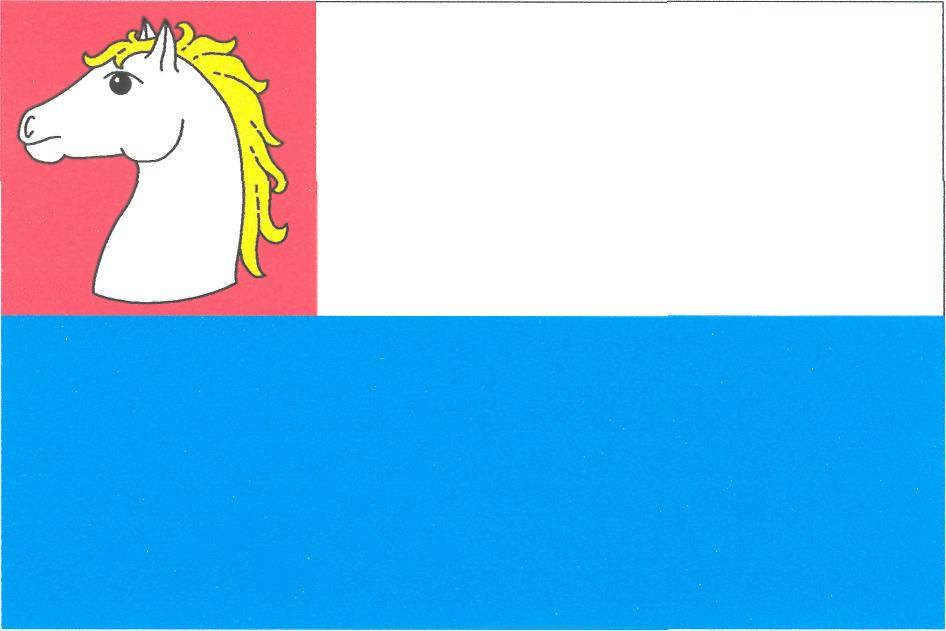
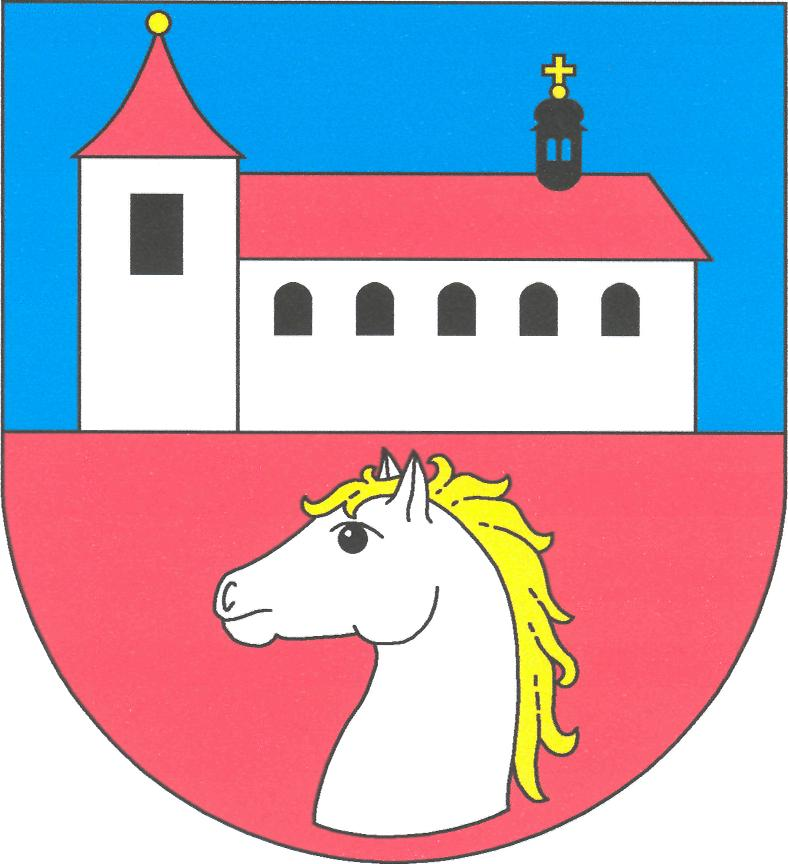
- Flag Coat of arms

- Location in the Czech Republic
- Coordinates: 50°15′27″N 14°41′57″E
- Country: Czech Republic
- Region: Central Bohemian
- District: Prague-East
- First mentioned: 1052

Area
  - Total: 6.83 km^{2} (2.64 sq mi)
- Elevation: 194 m (636 ft)

Population (2026-01-01)
  - Total: 512
  - Density: 75.0/km^{2} (194/sq mi)
- Time zone: UTC+1 (CET)
  - Summer (DST): UTC+2 (CEST)
- Postal code: 294 76
- Website: www.kostelnihlavno.cz

Kostelní Hlavno (German: Kirchenhlawno) is a municipality and village in Prague-East District in the Central Bohemian Region of the Czech Republic. It has about 500 inhabitants.

== Demographics ==
Historical population
Year	Pop.	±%
1869	609	—
1880	606	−0.5%
1890	590	−2.6%
1900	621	+5.3%
1910	723	+16.4%
1921	683	−5.5%
1930	591	−13.5%
1950	493	−16.6%
1961	472	−4.3%
1970	445	−5.7%
1980	414	−7.0%
1991	327	−21.0%
2001	355	+8.6%
2011	493	+38.9%
2021	501	+1.6%
Source: Censuses
