= Pomezí =

- Municipality
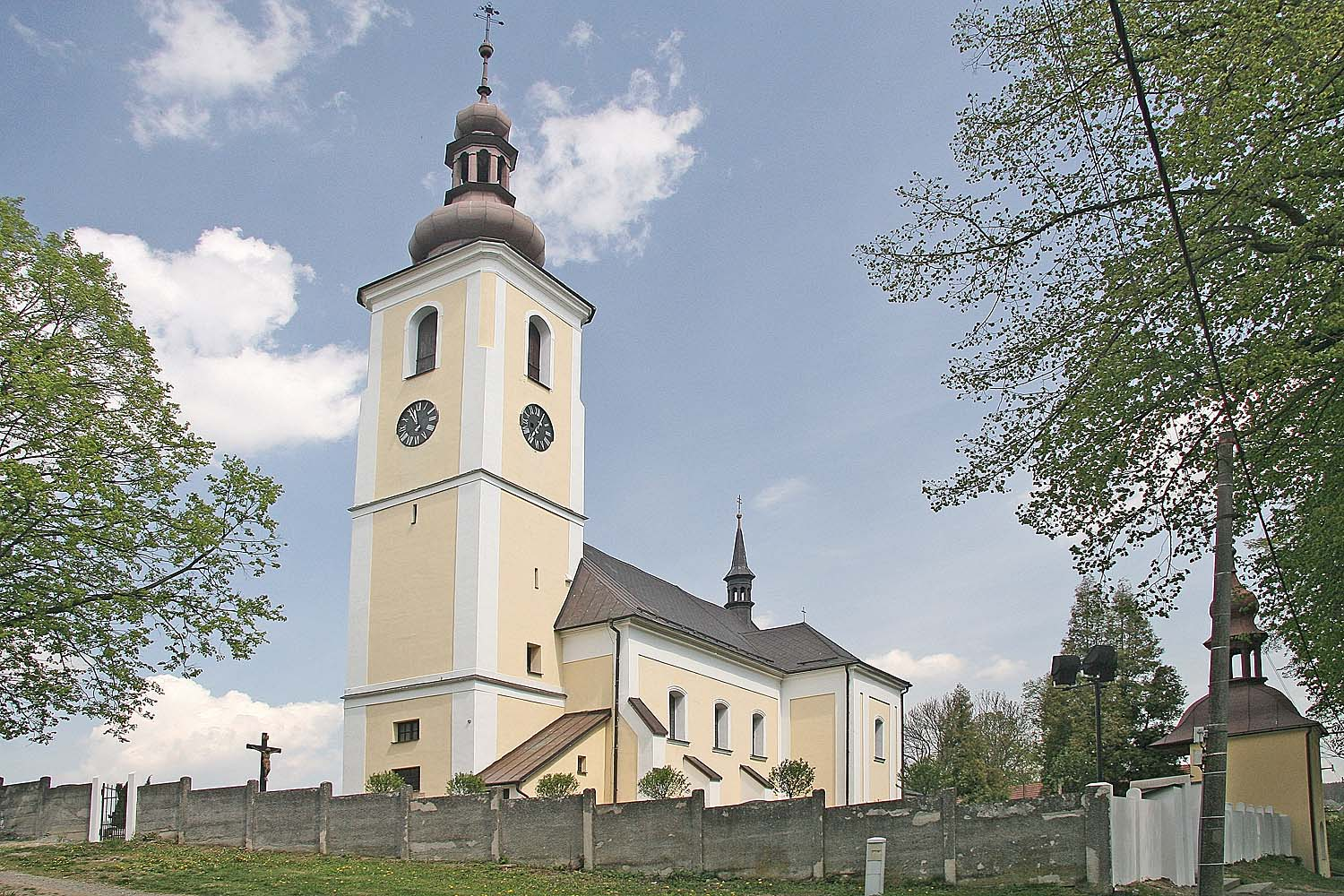
- Church of Saint George

- Flag Coat of arms

- Location in the Czech Republic
- Coordinates: 49°42′37″N 16°19′2″E
- Country: Czech Republic
- Region: Pardubice
- District: Svitavy
- First mentioned: 1265

Area
  - Total: 25.27 km^{2} (9.76 sq mi)
- Elevation: 575 m (1,886 ft)

Population (2026-01-01)
  - Total: 1,341
  - Density: 53.07/km^{2} (137.4/sq mi)
- Time zone: UTC+1 (CET)
  - Summer (DST): UTC+2 (CEST)
- Postal code: 569 71
- Website: www.obecpomezi.cz

Pomezí (German: Laubendorf) is a municipality and village in Svitavy District in the Pardubice Region of the Czech Republic. It has about 1,300 inhabitants.

Pomezí lies approximately 12 kilometres (7 mi) south-west of Svitavy, 54 km (34 mi) south-east of Pardubice, and 143 km (89 mi) east of Prague.

== Demographics ==
Historical population
Year	Pop.	±%
1869	1,667	—
1880	1,769	+6.1%
1890	1,828	+3.3%
1900	1,840	+0.7%
1910	1,871	+1.7%
1921	1,879	+0.4%
1930	1,766	−6.0%
1950	1,277	−27.7%
1961	1,323	+3.6%
1970	1,255	−5.1%
1980	1,129	−10.0%
1991	1,040	−7.9%
2001	1,058	+1.7%
2011	1,164	+10.0%
2021	1,251	+7.5%
Source: Censuses
