= Sudovo Hlavno =

- Municipality
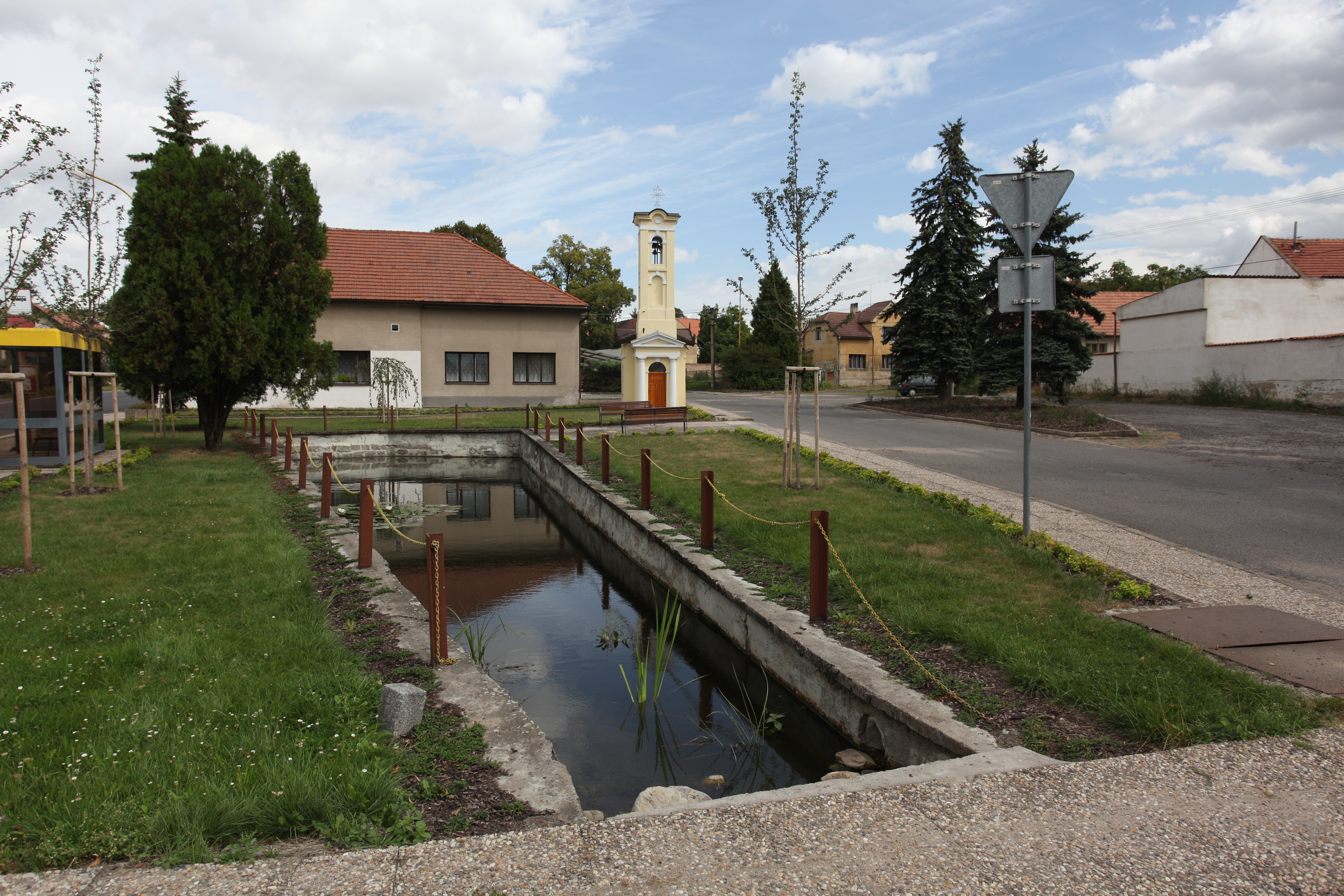
- Centre of Sudovo Hlavno

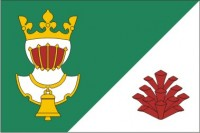
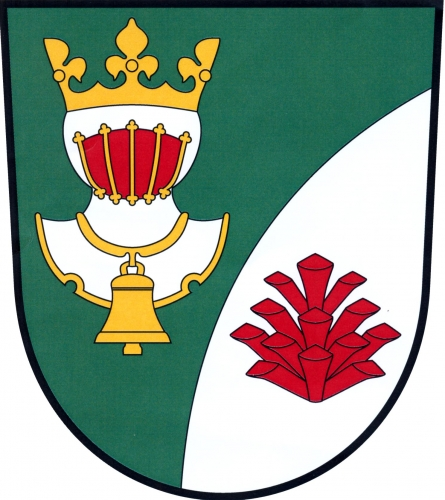
- Flag Coat of arms

- Location in the Czech Republic
- Coordinates: 50°15′46″N 14°41′7″E
- Country: Czech Republic
- Region: Central Bohemian
- District: Prague-East
- First mentioned: 1386

Area
  - Total: 13.41 km^{2} (5.18 sq mi)
- Elevation: 180 m (590 ft)

Population (2026-01-01)
  - Total: 518
  - Density: 38.6/km^{2} (100/sq mi)
- Time zone: UTC+1 (CET)
  - Summer (DST): UTC+2 (CEST)
- Postal code: 294 76
- Website: www.sudovohlavno.cz

Sudovo Hlavno is a municipality and village in Prague-East District in the Central Bohemian Region of the Czech Republic. It has about 500 inhabitants.

== Demographics ==
Historical population
Year	Pop.	±%
1869	559	—
1880	589	+5.4%
1890	580	−1.5%
1900	530	−8.6%
1910	602	+13.6%
1921	658	+9.3%
1930	568	−13.7%
1950	502	−11.6%
1961	472	−6.0%
1970	447	−5.3%
1980	438	−2.0%
1991	403	−8.0%
2001	418	+3.7%
2011	459	+9.8%
2021	518	+12.9%
Source: Censuses
