= Hrušovany (Chomutov District) =

- Municipality
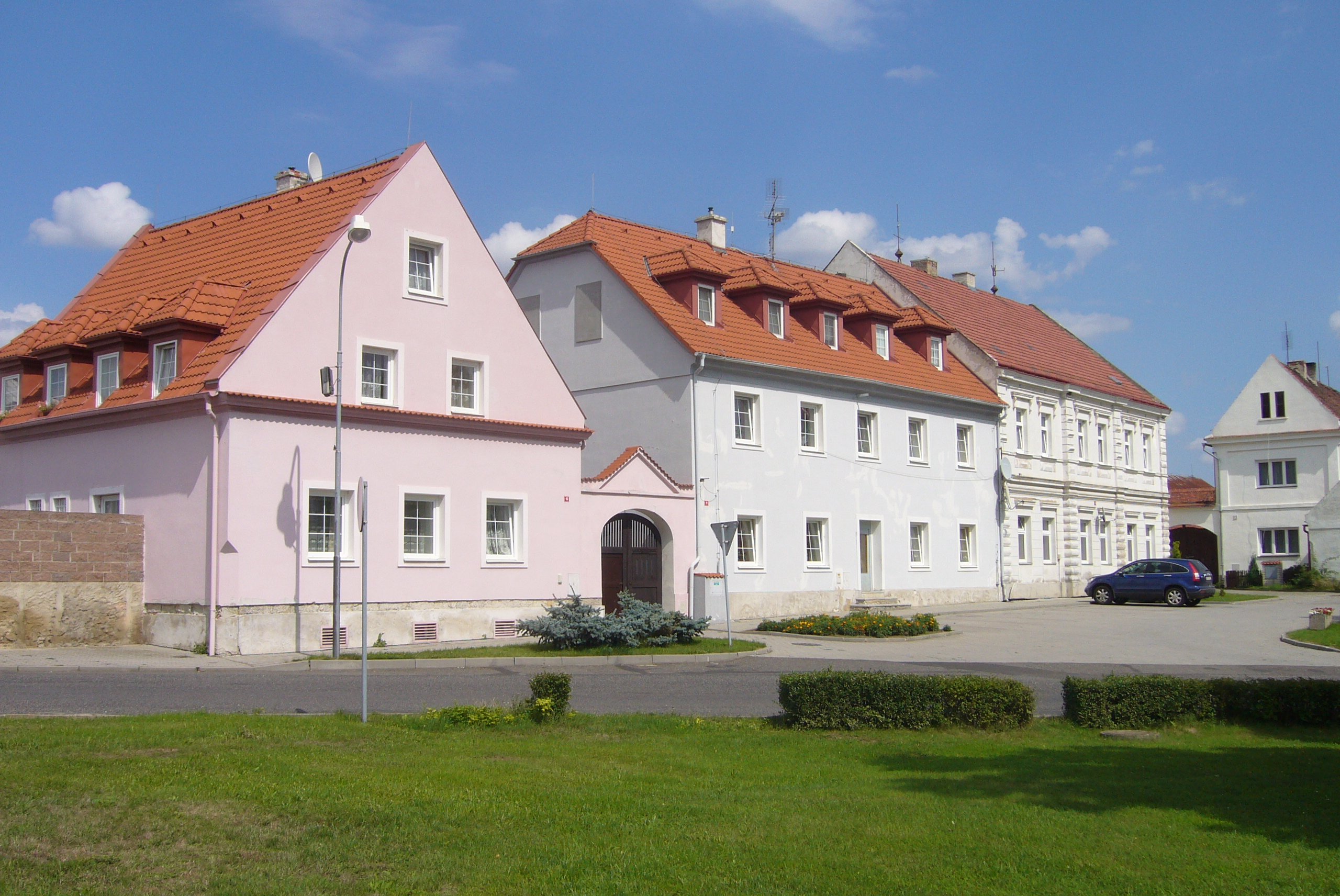
- Common in Hrušovany

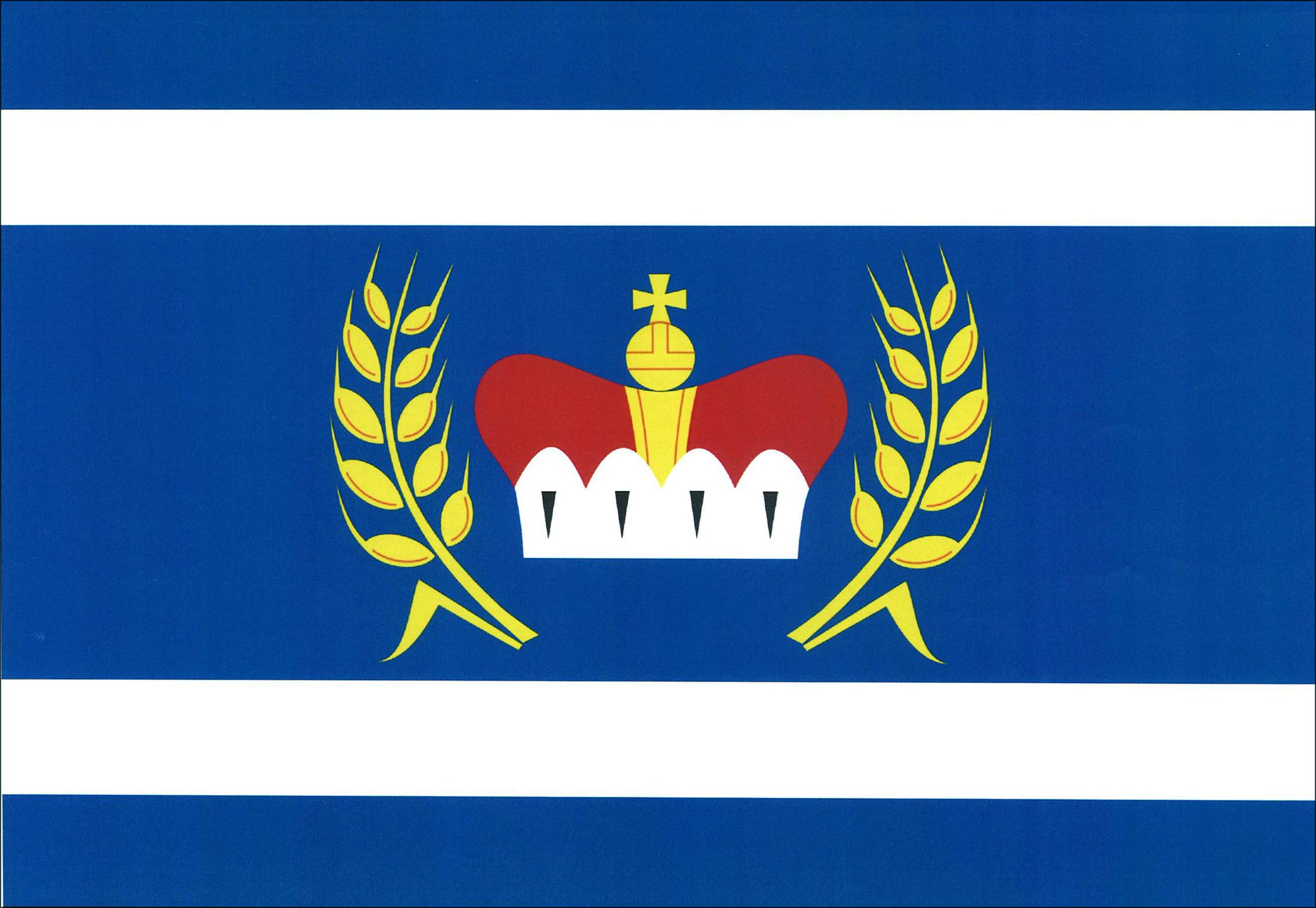
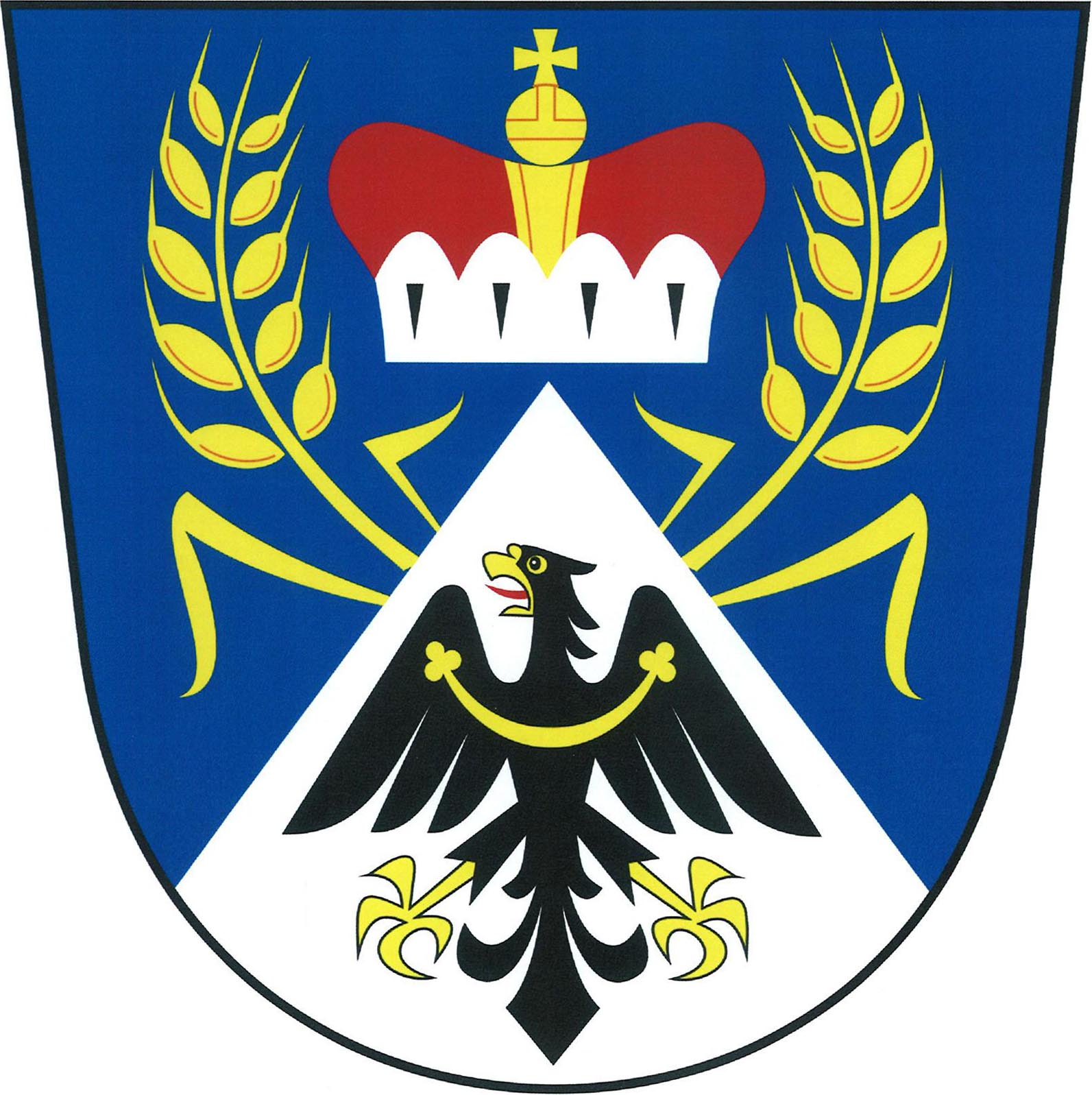
- Flag Coat of arms

- Location in the Czech Republic
- Coordinates: 50°23′14″N 13°29′54″E
- Country: Czech Republic
- Region: Ústí nad Labem
- District: Chomutov
- First mentioned: 1209

Area
  - Total: 12.57 km^{2} (4.85 sq mi)
- Elevation: 300 m (980 ft)

Population (2026-01-01)
  - Total: 514
  - Density: 40.9/km^{2} (106/sq mi)
- Time zone: UTC+1 (CET)
  - Summer (DST): UTC+2 (CEST)
- Postal codes: 431 43
- Website: www.obec-hrusovany.cz

Hrušovany is a municipality and village in Chomutov District in the Ústí nad Labem Region of the Czech Republic. It has about 500 inhabitants.

Hrušovany lies approximately 12 kilometres (7 mi) south-east of Chomutov, 49 km (30 mi) south-west of Ústí nad Labem, and 74 km (46 mi) north-west of Prague.

== Administrative division ==
Hrušovany consists of three municipal parts (in brackets population according to the 2021 census):

- Hrušovany (430)
- Lažany (48)
- Vysočany (2)

== Demographics ==
Historical population
Year	Pop.	±%
1869	655	—
1880	693	+5.8%
1890	653	−5.8%
1900	648	−0.8%
1910	686	+5.9%
1921	628	−8.5%
1930	631	+0.5%
1950	395	−37.4%
1961	412	+4.3%
1970	381	−7.5%
1980	212	−44.4%
1991	228	+7.5%
2001	248	+8.8%
2011	443	+78.6%
2021	480	+8.4%
Source: Censuses
