= List of Portuguese Air Force aircraft squadrons =

List of Portuguese Air Force aircraft squadrons and flights, past and present.

== Military Aeronautics (Army aviation) flying units ==
Name	Native name	Active	Base	Aircraft	Notes	
Mozambique Expeditionary Flight	Esquadrilha Expedicionária a Moçambique	1917–1918	Mocimboa da Praia Airfield, Mozambique	Farman F.40 (3x)	The first Portuguese operational unit of military aviation. Participated in the East African campaign of World War I	
Angola Expedicionary Flight	Esquadrilha Expedicionária a Angola	1918–1921	Lubango, Angola	Caudron G-4 (9x)	Transferred to Huambo. Transformed in the Angola Group of Aviation Flights (GEAA) in 1921	
"Republic" Group of Aviation Flights	Grupo de Esquadrilhas de Aviação "República" (GEAR)	1919–1927	Amadora Airfield	Breguet 14, SPAD S.VII,	AVRO 504K (May 1924) used by Cintra Flying School till 1934	The first operational unit of military aviation created in European Portugal. Transformed in the Information Aviation Group (GAI) in 1927
Mix Depot and Aviation Flight	Esquadrilha Mista de Aviação e Depósito (EMAD)	1920–?	Tancos Airfield	SPAD S.VII		
Angola Group of Aviation Flights	Grupo de Esquadrilhas de Aviação de Angola (GEAA)	1921–?	Huambo, Angola	Caudron G-4, Caudron G-3, Breguet Br.14-A2 (12x)		
Fighter Flight No. 1	Esquadrilha Nº1 de Caça	1926–1927	Tancos Airfield	Breguet 14	Transformed in the GIAPC in 1927	
Independent Combat and Protection Aviation Group	Grupo Independente de Aviação de Protecção de Combate (GIAPC)	1927–?	Tancos Airfield		Fighter unit	
Information Aviation Group	Grupo de Aviação de Informação (GAI)	1927–1938	Amadora Airfield		Reconnaissance unit	
Independent Bombardment Aviation Group	Grupo Independente de Aviação de Bombardeamento (GIAB)	1927–1940	Alverca		Strategic bombing unit. Transferred from Amadora	
Independent Assault Aviation Flight	Esquadrilha Independente de Aviação de Assalto	1939–1941	Granja do Marquês	Breda Ba-65 (10x)	Ground attack unit	
Day Bombardment Group	Grupo de Bombardeamento de Dia	1938–1940	Ota Airfield	Junkers Ju 52/3m (10x)	Strategic bombing unit	
Day Bombardment Group	Grupo de Bombardeamento de Dia	1940–?	Ota Airfield	Junkers Ju 86K-7 (10x)	Strategic bombing unit	
Night Bombardment Group	Grupo de Bombardeamento de Noite	1940–?	Ota Airfield	Junkers Ju 52 (10x)	Strategic bombing unit	
Fighter Flight	Esquadrilha de Caça	1940–?	Ota Airfield	Gloster Gladiator II (15x)	Air defense	
Expeditionary Fighter Flight No. 1	Esquadrilha Expedicionária de Caça Nº 1	1941–?	Rabo de Peixe Airfield, Azores	Gloster Gladiator II	Air defense and patrol squadron. Transferred from Tancos	
Expeditionary Fighter Flight No. 2	Esquadrilha Expedicionária de Caça nº2	1941–?	Achada, Azores	Gloster Gladiator II	Air defense and patrol squadron. Transferred from Ota	
Mohawk Flight	Esquadrilha Mohawk	1941	Ota Airfield	Curtiss 75A-4 Mohawk	Air defense. Squadron code XY	
Expeditionary Fighter Flight No. 3	Esquadrilha Expedicionária de Caça Nº 3	1941–?	Rabo de Peixe Airfield, Azores	Curtiss 75A-4 Mohawk	Air defense	
4 Flight	Esquadrilha 4	1943–?	Ota Airfield	Bell P-39L Airacobra	Air combat squadron. Also designated as Airacobra Squadron/Flight. Squadron code "OK"	
SU Flight	Esquadrilha SU	1943–1944	Ota Airfield	Hawker Hurricane IIC		
TY Flight	Esquadrilha TY	1943–1944	Ota Airfield	Hawker Hurricane IIB		
VX Flight	Esquadrilha VX	1943–1944	Ota Airfield	Hawker Hurricane IIC		
XZ Flight	Esquadrilha XZ	1943–1944	Tancos Airfield	Supermarine Spitfire I	Air defense squadron. Transferred to Ota as XZ 3rd Squadron	
Information and Reconnaissance Group	Grupo de Reconhecimento e Informação	1943–1952	Tancos Airfield	Westland Lysander IIIA	Reconnaissance and liaison squadron	
1st Flight / MR Flight	Esquadrilha 1 / Esquadrilha MR	1944–?	Ota Airfield	Supermarine Spitfire V	Air defense squadron	
2nd Flight / RL Flight	Esquadrilha 2 / Esquadrilha RL	1944–?	Ota Airfield	Supermarine Spitfire V	Air defense squadron	
Independent Fighter Aviation Squadron / VX Flight	Esquadrilha Independente de Aviação de Caça (EIAC) / Esquadrilha VX	1944–1946	Portela Airfield	Hawker Hurricane IIC	Air combat squadron	
ZE Flight	Esquadrilha ZE	1944–?	Ota Airfield	Bristol Blenheim, Supermarine Spitfire, North American T-6 Texan		
GL Flight	Esquadrilha GL	1944–?	Tancos Airfield	Hawker Hurricane		
Squadron 41	Esquadra 41	1947–1952	Lajes Air Base	SB-17G Flying Fortress, Douglas C-54 Skymaster, SC-54/HC-54 Searchmaster	Search and rescue and maritime patrol squadron	
RV Flight	Esquadrilha RV	1942–1948	Espinho Airfield	Hawker Hurricane		
Independent Fighter Aviation Group	Grupo Independente de Aviação de Caça (GIAC)	1948–1952	Espinho Airfield	Hawker Hurricane	Air defense squadron. Merger of squadrons VX and RV	
Training and Transport Flight	Esquadrilha de Treino e Transporte (ETT)	1947–1952	Granja do Marquês Airfield	Avro Anson T.1, Avro 626	Training and transport. Replaced by PoAF's 1st Transport Squadron	

== Portuguese Air Force flying units ==
=== Squadron designations ===
The basic aircraft unit of the Portuguese Air Force (PoAF) is the squadron (Portuguese: Esquadra), which is under the command and part of an operational group (Portuguese: Grupo Operacional). These operational groups are dependent of an air base and commonly use a numerical designation related to the air base's own numerical designation. (Example: Grupo Operacional 11 is dependent of Air Base No. 11.)

Since the Air Force's reorganization of 1978, squadrons have used a three digit designation, with some squadrons starting to adopt this designation system in 1977. The first digit indicates the squadron's primary mission, while the second digit indicates the type of aircraft operated, and with the third digit being a sequential number.

Primary mission designation:

1 – Instruction squadron;
2 – Fighter squadron;
3 – Attack squadron;
4 – Reconnaissance squadron;
5 – Transport squadron;
6 – Maritime patrol squadron;
7 – Search and Rescue squadron;
8 – Special function squadron;

Designation of the type of aircraft operated by the squadron:

0 – Fixed-wing aircraft;
1 – Mixed;
5 – Rotary-wing aircraft;

Until 1977, and prior to this designation system, the PoAF used both numerical designations and names for its flying squadrons. Names were almost exclusively used for small local liaison and transport units and dedicated training squadrons.

The squadrons that used a numerical designation received it based on the air base or base airfield number at which they were based in addition to a sequential number. In example, 51 and 52 Squadron were based at Air Base No. 5 and 122 Squadron was based at Air Base No. 12. Units based at base airfields (Portuguese: Aeródromo Base) received a zero as an additional digit in their numeric designation to help differentiate them from units based at air bases. In example, 501 Squadron was based at Base Airfield No. 5.

=== Flying squadrons ===
Name	Native name	Nickname	Active	Base	Aircraft	Notes
1st Transport Flight	1ª Esquadra de Transportes		1952–1953	Portela Airfield	C-54 Skymaster	Transport flight, replaced by 1st Military Air Transport Grouping
1st Military Air Transport Grouping	1º Agrupamento de Transportes Aéreos Militares		1953–1961	Portela Airfield	C-54 Skymaster	Transport unit, replaced by 81 Squadron
2nd Military Air Transport Grouping	2º Agrupamento de Transportes Aéreos Militares		1960–1961	Air Base 6, Montijo	DC-6	Transport unit, replaced by 82 Squadron
81 Squadron	Esquadra 81		1953–1972	Portela Airfield	C-54 Skymaster	Transport squadron, re-designated as 131 Squadron
Liaison and Training Flight	Esquadrilha de Ligação e Treino			Air Base 2, Ota	Avro Anson T.1, T-6 Texan, Miles Magister I	
10 Squadron	Esquadra 10		1952–1956	Air Base 2, Ota	F-47D Thunderbolt	Transferred to Tancos Air Base in 1955
11 Squadron	Esquadra 11		1952–1956	Air Base 2, Ota	F-47D Thunderbolt	Transferred to Tancos Air Base in 1955
41 Squadron	Esquadra 41		1952–1976	Air Base 4, Lajes	SB-17G Flying Fortress, Douglas C-54 Skymaster, SC-54/HC-54 Searchmaster	Search and rescue and maritime patrol squadron. Replaced by 42 Squadron and 503 Squadron Golfinhos
20 Squadron	Esquadra 20		1953–?	Air Base 2, Ota	F-47D Thunderbolt, T-33 Shooting Star	Air combat and training squadron. First squadron of the Portuguese Air Force to be equipped with jet aircraft
21 Squadron	Esquadra 21		1954–196?	Air Base 2, Ota	F-84G Thunderjet	Air combat squadron
22 Squadron	Esquadra 22		1955–1956	Air Base 2, Ota	F-84G Thunderjet, T-33 Shooting Star	Air combat and advanced combat training
Composite Squadron	Esquadra Mista		1954–?	"Sacadura Cabral" Naval Air Station, Montijo	G-44 Widgeon, T-6 Texan, SB2C Helldiver	
Anti-Submarine Operational Training Squadron	Esquadra de Intrução Operacional Anti-Submarino		?	"Gago Coutinho" Aviation School, São Jacinto	SB2C Helldiver	
Elementary Flying Training Squadron	Esquadra de Instrução Elementar de Pilotagem (EIEP)		195?–1974	"Gago Coutinho" Aviation School, São Jacinto (later Air Base 7)	Tiger Moth, DHC-1 Chipmunk	Re-designated as 21 Squadron
Liaison and Training Flight	Esquadrilha de Ligação e Treino		1955–1955	Air Base 3, Tancos	Airspeed Oxford, Piper L-21	
Composite Squadron	Esquadra Mista		1956–1959	Air Base 3, Tancos	Airspeed Oxford, Piper L-21, Junkers Ju 52	Portuguese: Esquadra Mista
Complementary Flying Training Squadron	Esquadra de Instrução Complementar de Pilotagem (EICP)	Caracóis (Snails)	1956–1957	Air Base 2, Ota	T-33 Shooting Star	Re-designated as Fighter Aircraft Complementary Flying Training Squadron (EICPAC – Esquadra de Instrução Complementar em Aviões de Caça)
103 Squadron / Fighter Aircraft Complementary Flying Training Squadron	Esquadra 103 / Esquadra de Instrução Complementar de Aviões de Caça		1957–1977	Air Base 5, Monte Real	T-33 Shooting Star	Training and fighter operational conversion. Re-designated as 103 Squadron
Heavy Aircraft Navigation and Complementary Training Squadron	Esquadra de Instrução Complementar de Pilotagem e Navegação em Aviões Pesados (EICPNAP)		1959–1963	Air Base 3, Tancos	Junkers Ju 52	Heavy aircraft navigational and complementary training squadron
Parachute Troops Transport and Training Squadron	Esquadra de Treino e Transporte de Tropas Paraquedistas (ETTTP)		1963–1971	Air Base 3, Tancos	Junkers Ju 52	Transport and training squadron. Replaced by 32 Squadron
1 Basic Flying Training Squadron	Esquadra de Instrução Básica de Pilotagem nº 1 (EIBP 1)		1964–?	Air Base 7, São Jacinto	T-6 Texan	Basic flight training
2 Basic Flying Training Squadron	Esquadra de Instrução Básica de Pilotagem nº 2 (EIBP 2)	Panchos (Panchos)	1963–1977	Air Base 1, Sintra	Cessna T-37C	Elementary flight training squadron. Two flights: Esquadrilha n° 1, "Feras" (Beasts), and Esquadrilha n° 2, "Águias" (Eagles). Re-designated as 102 Squadron
Heavy Aircraft Complementary Training Squadron	Esquadra de Instrução Complementar de Aviões Pesados (EICAP)		1960–?	Air Base 4, Lajes	C-47 Dakota, C-54 Skymaster	
61 Squadron	Esquadra 61		1956–1977	Air Base 6, Montijo	PV-2 Harpoon, P2V-5 Neptune	Anti-submarine and maritime patrol squadron. Maintained several temporary Neptune detachments in Africa until the end of the Colonial War
62 Squadron	Esquadra 62		1956–1961	Air Base 6, Montijo	PV-2 Harpoon	Anti-submarine, maritime patrol and ground attack. Deployed to Africa
50 Squadron	Esquadra 50		1958	Air Base 2, Ota	F-86F Sabre	Reformed as 51 Squadron
51 Squadron	Esquadra 51	Falcões (Falcons)	1959–1978	Air Base 5, Monte Real	F-86F Sabre, Fiat G.91, T-38A Talon	Aircraft assigned to the squadron used a blue tail scheme. Re-designated as 201 Squadron
52 Squadron	Esquadra 52	Galos (Roosters)	1959–1961	Air Base 5, Monte Real	F-86F Sabre	Aircraft assigned to the squadron used a red tail scheme
82 Squadron	Esquadra 82		1961–1972	Portela Airfield	DC-6	Transport squadron. Re-designated as 132 Squadron
91 Squadron	Esquadra 91		1961–1975	Air Base 9, Luanda	PV-2 Harpoon, Fiat G.91R/4	Ground attack and reconnaissance
92 Squadron	Esquadra 92	Elefantes (Elephants)	1961–1974	Air Base 9, Luanda	Nord Noratlas	
93 Squadron	Esquadra 93	Magníficos (Magnificences)	1961–?	Air Base 9, Luanda	F-84G Thunderjet, B-26 Invader	
94 Squadron	Esquadra 94	Moscas (Flies)	1963–1975	Air Base 9, Luanda	Alouette II and Alouette III	Helicopter squadron
103 Squadron	Esquadra 103		1962	Air Base 10, Beira	PV-2 Harpoon	Ground attack and reconnaissance squadron. Activated on February 1 and re-designated as 101 Squadron on November 19, 1962
101 Squadron	Esquadra 101		1962–?	Air Base 10, Beira	PV-2 Harpoon	Ground attack and reconnaissance squadron
102 Squadron	Esquadra 102		1962–?	Air Base 10, Beira	Nord Noratlas	
Liaison and Training Squadron	Esquadra de Ligação e Treino			Air Base 10, Beira	Auster D.5, T-6 Texan	
Operational Squadron	Esquadra Operacional			Base Airfield 3, Negage	Dornier Do 27	Portuguese: Esquadra Operacional do Aeródromo Base Nº 3
Airplane and Helicopter Mix Training Squadron	Esquadra Mista de Instrução de Aviões e Helicópteros (EMIAH)		1965–1968	Air Base 3, Tancos	Alouette II and Alouette III	
121 Squadron	Esquadra 121	Cafeteiras (Coffee pots)	1965	Air Base 12, Bissau	Dornier Do 27	Forward air controller, liaison and close air support squadron
121 Squadron	Esquadra 121	Tigres (Tigers)	1966	Air Base 12, Bissau	Fiat G.91	Close air support and air defense squadron
121 Squadron	Esquadra 121	Roncos (Roars)	1967–?	Air Base 12, Bissau	T-6 Texan	Forward air controller and close air support squadron
122 Squadron	Esquadra 122	Canibais (Cannibals)	1969–?	Air Base 12, Bissau	Alouette III	Close air support and tactical transport squadron. Alouette III armed with 20 mm cannons. Two flights: Canibais and Lobo Mau (Big Bad Wolf)
123 Squadron	Esquadra 123		1969–?	Air Base 12, Bissau	Nord Noratlas, Dornier Do 27	
Liaison, Training and Rescue Squadron	Esquadra de Ligação Treino e Socorro (ELTS)		1970–?	Portela Airfield	C-47 Dakota, C-45 Expeditor, Max Holste Broussard	Liaison, transport and search and rescue squadron
31 Squadron	Esquadra 31	Tigres (Tigers)	1970–?	Air Base 3, Tancos	T-6 Texan, Dornier Do 27, Auster D.5	Liaison, reconnaissance and close air support squadron. Mix Operational Squadron (Portuguese: Esquadra Operacional Mista)
32 Squadron	Esquadra 32		1971–1978	Air Base 3, Tancos	Junkers Ju 52, Nord Noratlas	Transport aircraft squadron
33 Squadron / Helicopter Complementary Training Squadron	Esquadra 33 / Esquadra de Instrução Complementar de Helicópteros (EICH)	Zangões (Drones)	1968–1978	Air Base 3, Tancos	Alouette II, Alouette III	
402 Squadron	Esquadra 402	Saltimbancos (Mountebanks)	1969–1975	Base Airfield 4, Henrique de Carvalho	Alouette III	
403 Squadron	Esquadra 403		1971–?	Base Airfield 4, Henrique de Carvalho	PV-2 Harpoon, C-47 Dakota	
501 Squadron	Esquadra 501	Tigres (Tigers)	1969–?	Base Airfield 5, Nacala	T-6 Texan, Dornier Do 27	Close air support and reconnaissance squadron
502 Squadron	Esquadra 502	Jaguares (Jaguars)	1969–?	Base Airfield 5, Nacala	Fiat G.91R/4	Close air support, air defense, and reconnaissance squadron
503 Squadron	Esquadra 503	Índios (Indians)	1967–1975	Base Airfield 5, Nacala	Alouette III	
601 Squadron	Esquadra 601	Venenosos (Poisonous)		Base Airfield 6, Nova Freixo	T-6 Texan	Liaison and close air support squadron
701 Squadron	Esquadra 701	Muskardos		Base Airfield 7, Tete	T-6 Texan, Dornier Do 27, Cessna 185	Liaison and close air support squadron
702 Squadron	Esquadra 702	Escorpiões (Scorpions)	1969–?	Base Airfield 7, Tete	Fiat G.91R/4	Close air support, air defense, and reconnaissance squadron
703 Squadron	Esquadra 703	Vampiros (Vampires)		Base Airfield 7, Tete	Alouette III, SA 330 Puma	Transport and MEDEVAC squadron
B-26 Detachment	Destacamento B-26	Diabos (Devils)	1970	Air Base 12, Bissau	B-26 Invader	Operational testing of the B-26 in tropical environment
801 Squadron	Esquadra 801			Base Airfield 8, Lourenço Marques	C-47 Dakota	Transport squadron
802 Squadron	Esquadra 802	Pegasos (Pegasus)		Base Airfield 8, Lourenço Marques	T-6 Texan	Close air support
131 Squadron	Esquadra 131		1971	Portela Airfield	DC-6	Transport squadron
132 Squadron	Esquadra 132		1971–1976	Portela Airfield	Boeing 707-3F5C	Transport squadron
21 Squadron	Esquadra 21	Magos (Wizards)	1974–1976	Air Base 2, Ota	DHC-1 Chipmunk	Elementary flight training squadron
701 Squadron	Esquadra 701	Jakarés (Alligators)	1975–1994	Air Base 2, Ota	Cessna Skymaster FTB-337G	Liaison and transport. Re-designated as 505 Squadron
42 Squadron	Esquadra 42		1976–1977	Air Base 4, Lajes	SA 330 Puma	Search and rescue squadron. Re-designated as 752 Squadron
101 Squadron	Esquadra 101	Roncos (Roars)	1978–curr.	Air Base 11, Beja	TB 30 Epsilon	Elementary and basic flying training squadron
102 Squadron	Esquadra 102	Panchos (Panchos)	1977–1992	Air Base 1, Sintra	Cessna T-37C	Elementary flight training squadron
103 Squadron	Esquadra 103	Caracóis (Snails)	1955–curr.	Air Base 11, Beja	T-33 Shooting Star, T-38 Talon, Alpha Jet	Complementary flight training and operational transition training squadron
111 Squadron	Esquadra 111		1978–1993	Air Base 3, Tancos	Alouette II, Alouette III, C-212 Aviocar	Fixed-wing multi-engine flight and helicopter flight instruction
201 Squadron	Esquadra 201	Falcões (Falcons)	1978–1981; 1993–curr.	Air Base 5, Monte Real	F-16 Fighting Falcon	
301 Squadron	Esquadra 301	Jaguares (Jaguars)	1978–curr.	Air Base 5, Monte Real	Fiat G.91, Alpha Jet, F-16 Fighting Falcon	
302 Squadron	Esquadra 302	Falcões (Falcons)	1981–1996	Air Base 5, Monte Real	A-7 Corsair II	Attack and air defense squadron
304 Squadron	Esquadra 304	Magníficos (Magnificences)	1984–1999	Air Base 5, Monte Real	A-7 Corsair II	Attack and air defense squadron
401 Squadron	Esquadra 401	Cientistas (Scientists)	1966–2011	Air Base 6, Montijo	C-212 Aviocar	Photographic survey, reconnaissance, and maritime patrol squadron
501 Squadron	Esquadra 501	Bisontes (Bisons)	1977–curr.	Air Base 6, Montijo	C-130 Hercules	Transport squadron
502 Squadron	Esquadra 502	Elefantes (Elephants)	1978–curr.	Air Base 6, Montijo	C-212 Aviocar, C-295M	Tactical and general transport, maritime patrol, MEDEVAC squadron. Detachment operating from Lajes Air Base
503 Squadron	Esquadra 503	Golfinhos (Dolphins)	1977–1993	Air Base 4, Lajes	C-212 Aviocar	Transport and maritime patrol squadron, initially designated as Maritime Patrol and Transport Squadron (Portuguese: Esquadra de Transporte e Patrulhamento Marítimo). Merged into 711 Squadron
504 Squadron	Esquadra 504	Linces (Lynxes)	1985–curr.	Air Base 6, Montijo	Dassault Falcon 20DC, Dassault Falcon 50	VIP transport and medical evacuation squadron
505 Squadron	Esquadra 505	Jakarés (Alligators)	1994–2005	Air Base 6, Montijo	Cessna Skymaster FTB-337G	Liaison and transport. Also designated as 505 Flight (Portuguese: Esquadrilha 505)
551 Squadron	Esquadra 551		1978–current	Air Base 6, Montijo	Alouette III, UH-60A Blackhawk	Tactical air transport
552 Squadron	Esquadra 552	Zangões (Drones)	1978–curr.	Air Base 1, Sintra	AW119 Mk II Koala	Tactical air transport, helicopter flight training squadron. Search and rescue detachment operating from Ovar
711 Squadron	Esquadra 711	Albatrozes (Albatrosses)	1993–2008	Air Base 4, Lajes	SA 330 Puma, C-212 Aviocar	Search and rescue and MEDEVAC squadron
751 Squadron	Esquadra 751	Pumas (Pumas)	1978–curr.	Air Base 1, Sintra	EH-101 Merlin	Search and rescue and transport squadron. Detachment operating from Lajes Air Base
752 Squadron	Esquadra 752	Pumas (Pumas)	1977–1993; 2008–2011	Air Base 4, Lajes	SA 330 Puma	Search and rescue and transport squadron. Merged into 711 Squadron
601 Squadron	Esquadra 601	Lobos (Wolves)	1986–curr.	Air Base 11, Beja	P-3 Orion	Maritime patrol and anti-submarine warfare
802 Squadron	Esquadra 802	Águias (Eagles)	1977–curr.	Air Base 11, Sintra	Schleicher ASK 21, DHC-1 Chipmunk, LET L-23	Air Force Academy flight instruction squadron

== See also ==
- Portuguese Air Force
- Portuguese Army
- Portuguese Naval Aviation
- Portuguese Armed Forces
- Portuguese Colonial War
- Portuguese Army Light Aviation Unit
- List of aircraft of the Portuguese Armed Forces
- List of Portuguese Air Force bases
- Portuguese military aircraft serials
- Portuguese aircraft serials
