= Exercise Real Thaw =

Military exercise

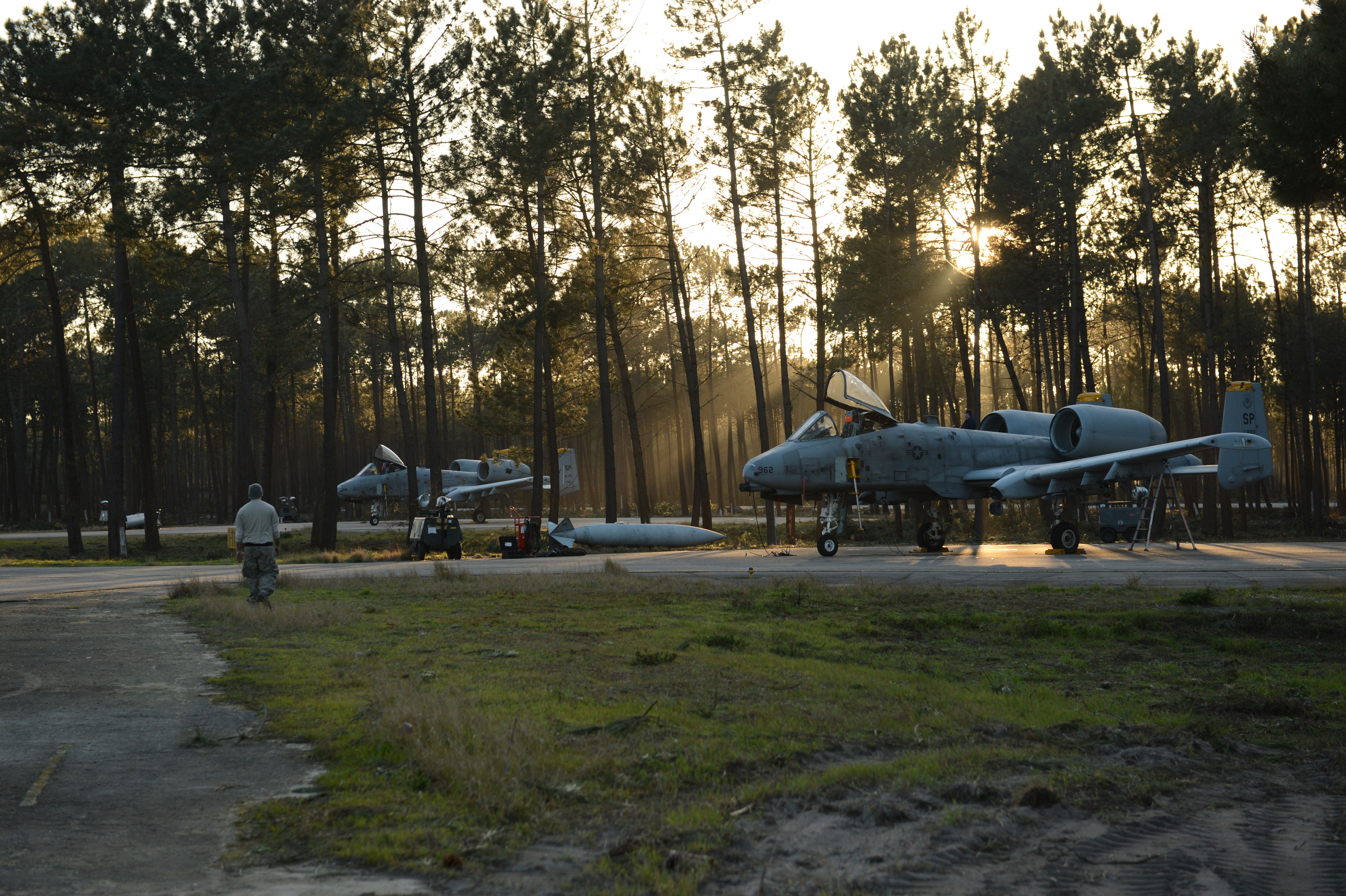
A-10 Thunderbolt II jets from the USAF 81st Fighter Squadron after a mission in Monte Real, Portugal, 14 Feb 2013

Real Thaw is an annual military exercise organized and hosted by the Portuguese Air Force (PoAF) with the participation of forces from the Army and Navy and foreign military forces. The exercise has the objective of creating a realistic as possible operational environment in which Portuguese forces might participate, provide joint training with both land, air and naval forces, and provide interoperability between different countries.

== History ==
The exercise originated from two exercises (Real Warm and Real Thaw 2008) organized at Monte Real Air Base (BA5) in 2008 with the personnel from 201 Squadron and 301 Squadron. The first official Real Thaw took place in 2009 and has since been coordinated and hosted by the BA5 personnel, and involves ground-attack, close air support, combat search and rescue, tactical transport, Composite Air Operations (COMAO), personnel recovery, slow mover protection, high value airborne asset (HVAA) protection, convoy escort and electronic warfare operations.

=== Real Thaw 2009 ===
The first Real Thaw took place in 2009 for four weeks involving 400 personnel from the PoAF, 40 from the Portuguese Army's Special Operations and airborne, as well personnel from the Portuguese Marine Corps integrated in a parallel training exercise of the Portuguese Navy. International participation in the exercise was composed of Joint terminal attack controller teams from the United States, four F-16 fighters from the Royal Danish Air Force, four EF-18A fighters from the Spanish Air Force's Ala 15 and a NATO E-3A Sentry AWACS.

=== Real Thaw 2010 ===
Real Thaw 2010 took place from 18 January to 4 February with the foreign participation of F-16 fighters from Belgium Air Force and Royal Danish Air Force, Spanish Air Force EF-18A fighters, E-3 Sentry from NATO, and forward air controllers from the United States, Denmark and Lithuania.

=== Real Thaw 2011 ===
The exercise in 2011 took place from 28 March to 8 April, with units from the three branches of the Portuguese Armed Forces and the participation of forward air controllers from the United States, C-130 Hercules from the Belgium Air Force, a Cobham's electronic warfare Falcon 20 from the United Kingdom, EF-18A fighters from the Spanish Air Force. The exercise was postponed to March and April due to a NATO evaluation and exercise (FORCEVAL) of the 201 and 301 Squadron taking place that year at the time period that Real Thaw usually takes place.

=== Real Thaw 2012 ===
In 2012 the exercise was organized from 23 January to 3 February, in addition to the national military forces from the Portuguese Army, Air Force and Navy, took part in the exercise forward air controllers from the United States and The Netherlands, Eurofighter Typhoon fighters from the Spanish Air Force's Ala 11 and one Airbus A330 MRTT, one Falcon 20 from the United Kingdom, and one E-3 Sentry AWACS from NATO.

=== Real Thaw 2013 ===
Real Thaw 2013 takes place from 11 to 22 February and marks its fifth anniversary. The exercise involves the Portuguese Army, Air Force and Navy, and four international forces: Forward air controllers (FAC) and medical staff from The Netherlands, FAC and A-10 Thunderbolt II from 81st Fighter Squadron, supported by 351st Expeditionary Air Refueling Squadron, from the United States Air Force (USAF), Cobham's Falcon 20 from the United Kingdom, and one E-3 Sentry AWACS from NATO.

=== Real Thaw 2015 ===
23 February – 6 March 2015 Beja Air Base will be the command headquarters and the Seia airfield will operate as Tactic Air Base to support the operations that will happen on that area of Portugal. This military exercise involves the Portuguese Air Force, Army and Navy and four other countries will be at the exercise as well. The United States and The Netherlands with Forward Air Controllers (FAC); Falcon 20 from the Cobham Team and E-3A AWACS. From Denmark 4 Fennec helicopters. From Spain: 4 EF-2000 Eurofighter, 4 EF-18A Hornet and 1 C-295. And from Portugal: 1 C-130; 1 C-295; 1 EH-101; 1 P-3C CUP+; 3 Alouette III; 4 Alpha Jets and 14 F-16AM.

So, the next two weeks will be very active here in Portugal with this military exercise, and a spotter's day next 26 February at Beja Air Base. Last year we had the participation of USAF F-16C's from Aviano, and you can see a few photos .

=== Real Thaw 2016 ===
In 2016 the exercise was organized between 21 February and 4 March, in the annual exercise "REAL THAW 2016", based at Beja Air Base. As the annual exercise of the Air Force, the Real Thaw aims to assess and certify its operational capacity, providing training, qualification and readiness to the various units, with a view to a possible projection of forces in an operation theater. This year's edition will involve, in addition to the Air Force, the Navy and the Army, the participation of forces from Belgium, Denmark, Spain, The Netherlands and the United States of America and also NATO air resources, in a total of 42 aircraft and about 3500 military personnel.

=== Real Thaw 2017 ===
The Portuguese Air Force carried out, between 5 and 17 March, the annual exercise "REAL THAW 2017" This year's edition, coordinated from Beja Air Base, in Beja, will involve means from the Air Force, Navy and Army of Portugal, as well as military forces from Belgium, Denmark, United States of America, Spain, France, Netherlands and NATO air assets. The training, which started on 5 March, involved about 3,500 soldiers and took 33 military planes off Beja daily.

=== Real Thaw 2018 ===
Beginning on 29 January 2018, and ending on 9 February 2018, the REAL THAW 2018 exercise will be underway, planned and conducted under the auspices of Air Command, an organ of the Portuguese Air Force. Involving the various weapons of Portuguese Armed Forces in operational theater, approximately 1000 military personnel and 50 aircraft of military forces from Belgium, Denmark, the United States of America, Spain, France and The Netherlands.

=== Real Thaw 2019 ===
The Portuguese Air Force conducts the multinational exercise Real Thaw 2019, takes place between 22 September and 4 October, from the Beja Air Base, in Beja. The Real Thaw 2019 brings together military personnel from the Portuguese Air Force, Navy and Army and forces from Denmark, Spain, France, The Netherlands, the United States of America and NATO, for a total of 600 participants and 21 aircraft.

=== Real Thaw 2020 ===
The Real Thaw 2020 was canceled due the COVID-19 pandemic.

=== Real Thaw 2021 ===
The Air Force, through the Air Command, performs the multidisciplinary exercise Real Thaw 2021 (RT21), between 15 and 26 March, from the Beja Air Base. In addition to supporting the fight against COVID-19 and fulfilling the missions of public and international interest assigned to it, with maximum safety and efficiency, the Air Force must continue to prepare and qualify its forces for the complete fulfillment of the mission. RT21 proves to be fundamental, in this context, to ensure the readiness of human and air resources. Due to COVID-19 pandemic, this exercise was only attended by 400 military personnel from the Portuguese Armed Forces.

=== Real Thaw 2022 ===
The Air Force performs the annual Real Thaw 2022 exercise (RT22), between 26 June and 8 July, at Beja Air Base. This multidisciplinary exercise aims to enhance joint training and provide participants with a wide range of tactical missions, with the intention of sharing knowledge, increasing integration, promoting innovation and strengthening ties between NATO partners.

=== Real Thaw 2023 ===
The Air Force carries out the Real Thaw 2023 (RT23) exercise between February 27th and March 10th, at Beja Air Base. This exercise aims to enhance joint and combined training in order to provide participants with a wide range of tactical missions.

== Participants ==
List of all participants since Real Thaw 2009:

=== National participants ===
- Portuguese Army
  - Mechanized Brigade
  - Portuguese Army Commandos
  - Special Operations Troops Centre
  - Parachute Troops School
- Portuguese Navy
  - Portuguese Marine Corps
  - Special Actions Detachment
- Portuguese Air Force
  - 101 Squadron (Socata TB 30 Epsilon)
  - 103 Squadron (Alpha Jet)
  - 201 Squadron (F-16 Fighting Falcon)
  - 301 Squadron (F-16 Fighting Falcon)
  - 501 Squadron (C-130 Hercules)
  - 502 Squadron (CASA C-295M)
  - 552 Squadron (AW119 Koala, Alouette III)
  - 601 Squadron (Lockheed P-3C Cup + Orion)
  - 751 Squadron (EH-101 Merlin)
  - 991 Squadron (UAVision OGASSA OGS 42N/VN)
  - Tactical Air Control Party
  - NOTP

=== International participants ===
- NATO
  - Boeing E-3 Sentry AWACS
- Belgium
  - Belgian Air Component (F-16 Fighting Falcon, C-130 Hercules, A400M Atlas)
  - Tactical Air Control Party
- Denmark
  - Eskadrille 721 (C-130 Hercules)
  - Eskadrille 724 (AS 550)
  - Eskadrille 727 (F-16 Fighting Falcon)
  - Eskadrille 730 (F-16 Fighting Falcon)
  - Tactical Air Control Party
- France
  - French Air and Space Force (C-130 Hercules, Transall C-160, Dassault Rafale, Boeing E-3 Sentry AWACS, Airbus A330 MRTT)
  - AVdef - Aviation Défence Service (Dassault Falcon 20C)
- Germany
  - Air controller
- Lithuania
  - Tactical Air Control Party
- Netherlands
  - Royal Netherlands Air Force (C-130 Hercules)
  - Tactical Air Control Party
- Poland
  - Air controller
- Spain
  - Ala 11 (Eurofighter Typhoon)
  - Ala 15 (F-18 Hornet)
  - Ala 37 (C-212 Aviocar)
- United Kingdom
  - Cobham plc (Falcon 20 Electronic Warfare Training)
- United States
  - 31st Fighter Wing (F-16 Fighting Falcon)
  - 52nd Fighter Wing (F-16 Fighting Falcon)
  - 81st Fighter Squadron (A-10 Thunderbolt II)
  - 480th Fighter Squadron (F-16 Fighting Falcon)
  - 94th Airlift Wing (C-130 Hercules)
  - 493rd Fighter Squadron (F-15 Eagle)
  - 23rd Bomb Squadron (B-52 Stratofortress)
  - KC-135 Stratotanker
  - Tactical Air Control Party

== See also ==
- NATO
- Portuguese Armed Forces
- Portuguese Air Force
- United States Air Force
- Green Flag exercise
- Hot Blade
- European Defence Agency
