= Sintra Air Base =

Portuguese Air Force base

Sintra Air Base Base Aérea de Sintra
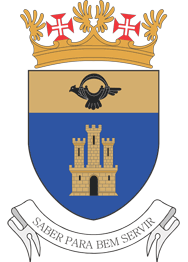

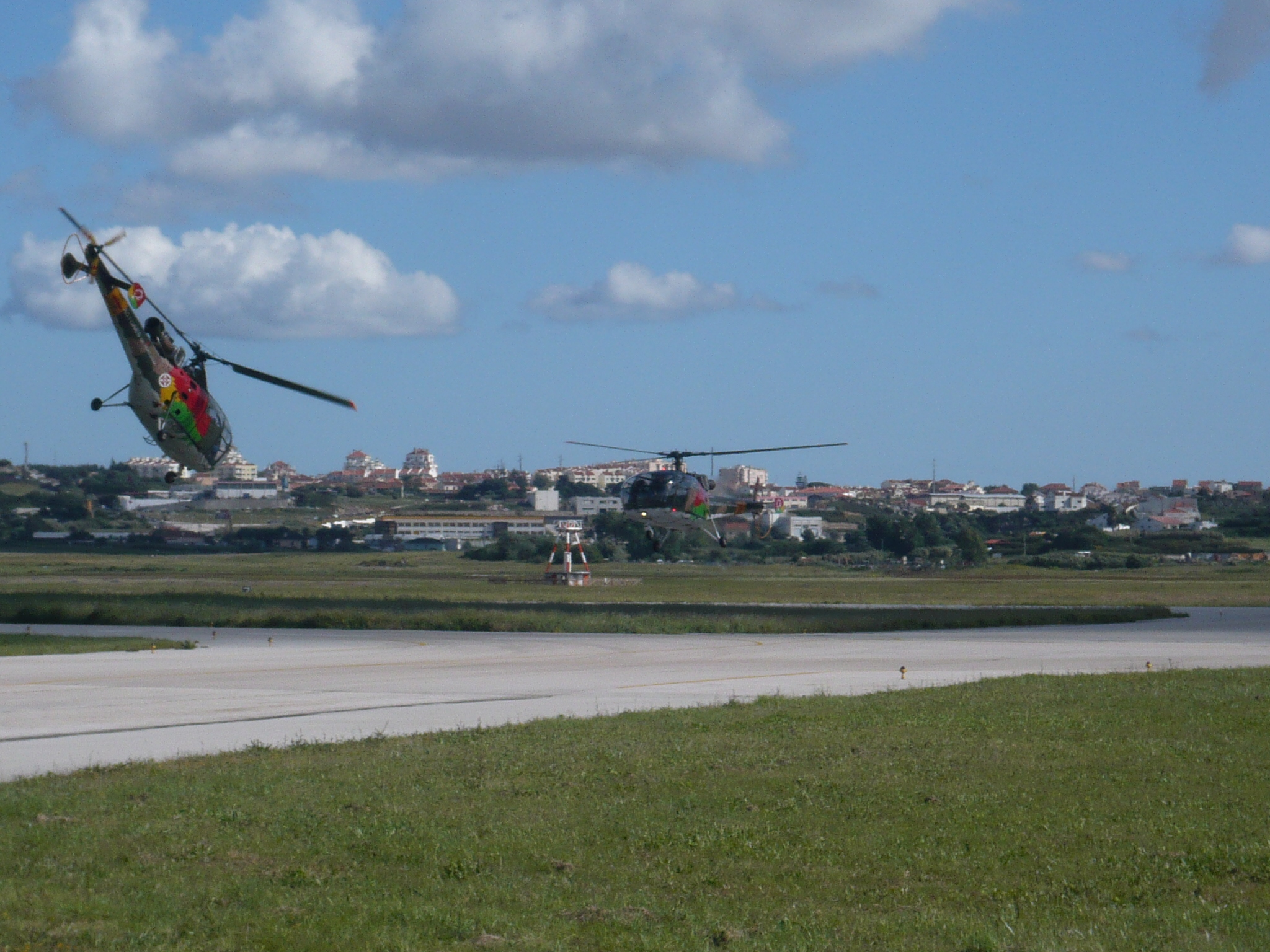
- IATA: none; ICAO: LPST

Summary
- Airport type: Military
- Operator: Portuguese Air Force
- Location: Sintra
- In use: 1920
- Commander: Colonel Luis Manuel Nunes Serôdio
- Elevation AMSL: 440 ft / 134.11 m
- Coordinates: 38°49′51.79″N 009°20′22.39″W

Map
- Location in Portugal

Runways
Direction	Length		Surface
Direction	ft	m	Surface
14/32	5,906	1,800	Asphalt
- Sources: World Aero Data

Sintra Air Base (Portuguese: Base Aérea de Sintra) (ICAO: LPST), officially designated as Air Base No. 1 (Portuguese: Base Aérea Nº 1, BA1), is a Portuguese Air Force base located in the Sintra Municipality, Portugal. The base is home to a flight training squadron and the Portuguese Air Force Academy.

== History ==
The origins of the air base date back to the creation of the Portuguese Army's School of Military Aeronautics (Portuguese: Escola de Aeronáutica Militar, EAM) on May 14, 1914. The school was originally located at Vila Nova da Rainha and was later transferred to Granja do Marquês on February 5, 1920.

In October 1939 the school was disbanded and the base was designated as Air Base No. 1. Since its creation it has been home to the main training and instruction of the Portuguese Air Force's pilots and technicians, having been base to de Havilland Tiger Moth, North American T-6 Texan, Cessna T-37 Tweet, and other flight training aircraft.

Between 1939 and late 1940s squadrons of ground attack and bomber units equipped with the Breda Ba-65Bis (Esquadrilha Independente de Aviões de Assalto) and converted-Junkers Ju 52/3m (Grupo de Bombardeamento de Dia and Grupo de Bombardeamento de Noite) were based at Sintra Air Base.

The base later became home to the Basic Flight Training Group (Portuguese: Grupo de Instrução Básica de Pilotagem, GIBP), with Basic Flight Training Squadron No. 1 (Portuguese: Esquadra de Instrução Básica de Pilotagem nº 1, E.I.P.B. 1) and Basic Flight Training Squadron No. 2 (Portuguese: Esquadra de Instrução Básica de Pilotagem nº 2, E.I.B.P. 2).

From 1966, with the creation of Transport and Liaison Squadron (Portuguese: Esquadra de Ligação e Transporte), to 2009 the base was also home to transport, liaison, aerial photographic reconnaissance, and maritime patrol squadrons. In 1993, 502 Squadron was transferred to BA1.

Between October 1989 and June 1993, 101 Squadron, equipped with the Aérospatiale Epsilon TB-30, was based and operated from Sintra before being transferred to Beja Air Base. This squadron replaced both squadrons of the Basic Flight Training Group in providing elementary and basic flight training.

In 2009, 101 Sqn. was transferred back to Sintra and 401 Sqn. and 502 Sqn. were transferred to Air Base No. 6 (Portuguese: Base Aérea Nº 6, BA6) in Montijo.

Located at the air base is also the Air Force Academy and the Air Force's Air Museum.

== Tenant units ==
- 802 Sqn. "Águias" (Eagles) — Air Force Academy auxiliary squadron
- 101 Sqn. "Roncos" (Roars) — elementary and basic flying training

== Airlines and destinations ==
As of 19 October 2022, there are no regular commercial passenger flights at Sintra Air Base.

== See also ==
- List of airports in Portugal
- Portuguese Air Force
- Asas de Portugal
- 101 Squadron
- 102 Squadron
- 401 Squadron
- 502 Squadron
