= Rotores de Portugal =

Rotors of Portugal
- Rotores de Portugal
- Rotores de Portugal insignia
- Active: April, 1976 to 2010
- Disbanded: 2010
- Country: Portugal
- Branch: Portuguese Air Force
- Type: Aerobatic team
- Role: Helicopter flight demonstration
- Size: 5 Officers; 6 Enlisted
- Part of: Squadron 552
- Base: No 11 Air Base, Beja, Portugal

Aircraft flown
- Helicopter: Aérospatiale Alouette III

The Rotores de Portugal (Portuguese for "Rotors of Portugal") is a helicopter flight demonstration team created in 1976, operated by Squadron 552 (Esquadra 552) of the Portuguese Air Force, based in No 11 Air Base, Beja. They are the national helicopter display team of Portugal and use three Sud Aviation Alouette III.

In 1976, the aerobatic team Rotores de Portugal was created by order of the Air Force Chief of Staff (CEMFA) to represent the Portuguese Air Force in several festivals all over the country. The team operated for 18 years while integrated with the 102 Squadron, and flew a total of 41 demonstrations.

On the fifty-third anniversary of the Air Force, in 2005, the Rotores de Portugal were reactivated as part of the 552 Squadron, based at Beja Air Base.

By that time, a special colourful livery was applied to the helicopters operated by the Air Force, which included the national colours and the name of the team. As these helicopters were not exclusively used by the team, it started to be a common sight to see Alouette III sporting the special livery while performing the most varied missions, from search and rescue to airmobile assaults exercises. Even after the suspension of the Rotores de Portugal activity, these helicopters continued to sport their respective livery.

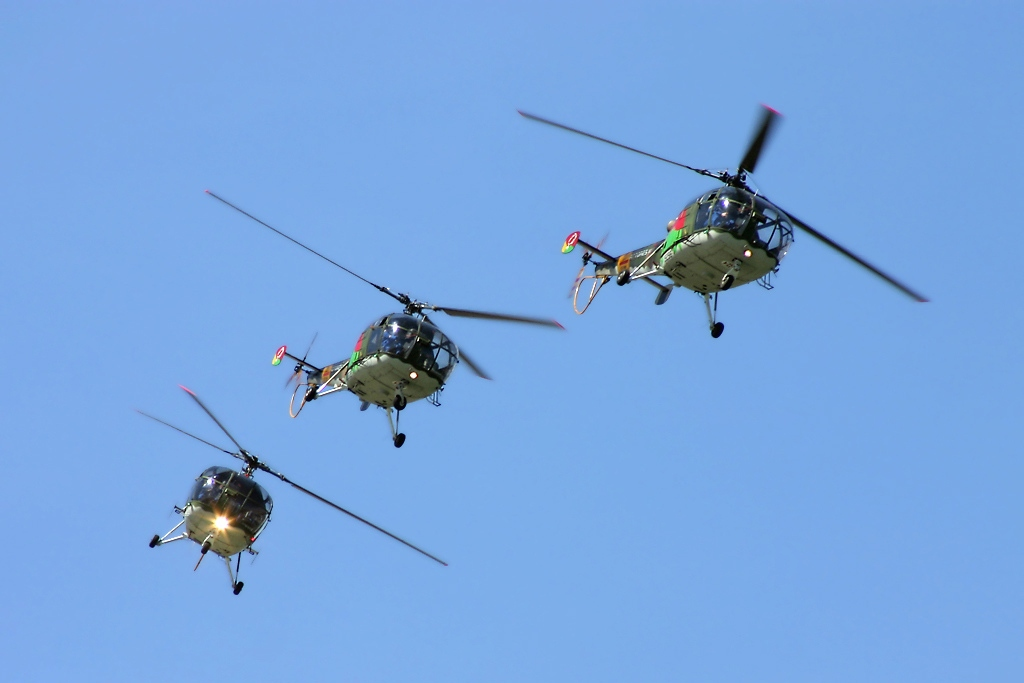
Three SA319 helicopters from Rotores de Portugal team

The last performing of the Rotores de Portugal occurred in 2010, with the team being currently inactive. Meanwhile, the Portuguese Air Force initiated the deactivation of their remaining Alouette III helicopters, which are being replaced by a smaller number of AgustaWestland AW119 Koala.

== Aircraft, bases and squadrons ==
Aircraft type	Base	Squadron	Display aircraft	Dates
Sud Aviation Alouette III	Air Base No 3, Tancos	Squadron 33	4	1976–1980
Sud Aviation Alouette III	Air Base No 3, Tancos	Squadron 102	2	1982–1992
Sud Aviation Alouette III	Air Base No 3, Tancos	Squadron 111	4	1993–1994
Sud Aviation Alouette III	Air Base No 11, Beja	Squadron 552	2	2004–2005
Sud Aviation Alouette III	Air Base No 11, Beja	Squadron 552	3	2006—2010

== See also ==
- Asas de Portugal
