= Academia da Força Aérea =

Academia da Força Aérea (Portuguese for "Air Force Academy") may refer to:

- Brazilian Air Force Academy, the air force academy of Brazil
- Portuguese Air Force Academy, the air force academy of Portugal
