= 552 Squadron (Portugal) =

- Esquadra 552
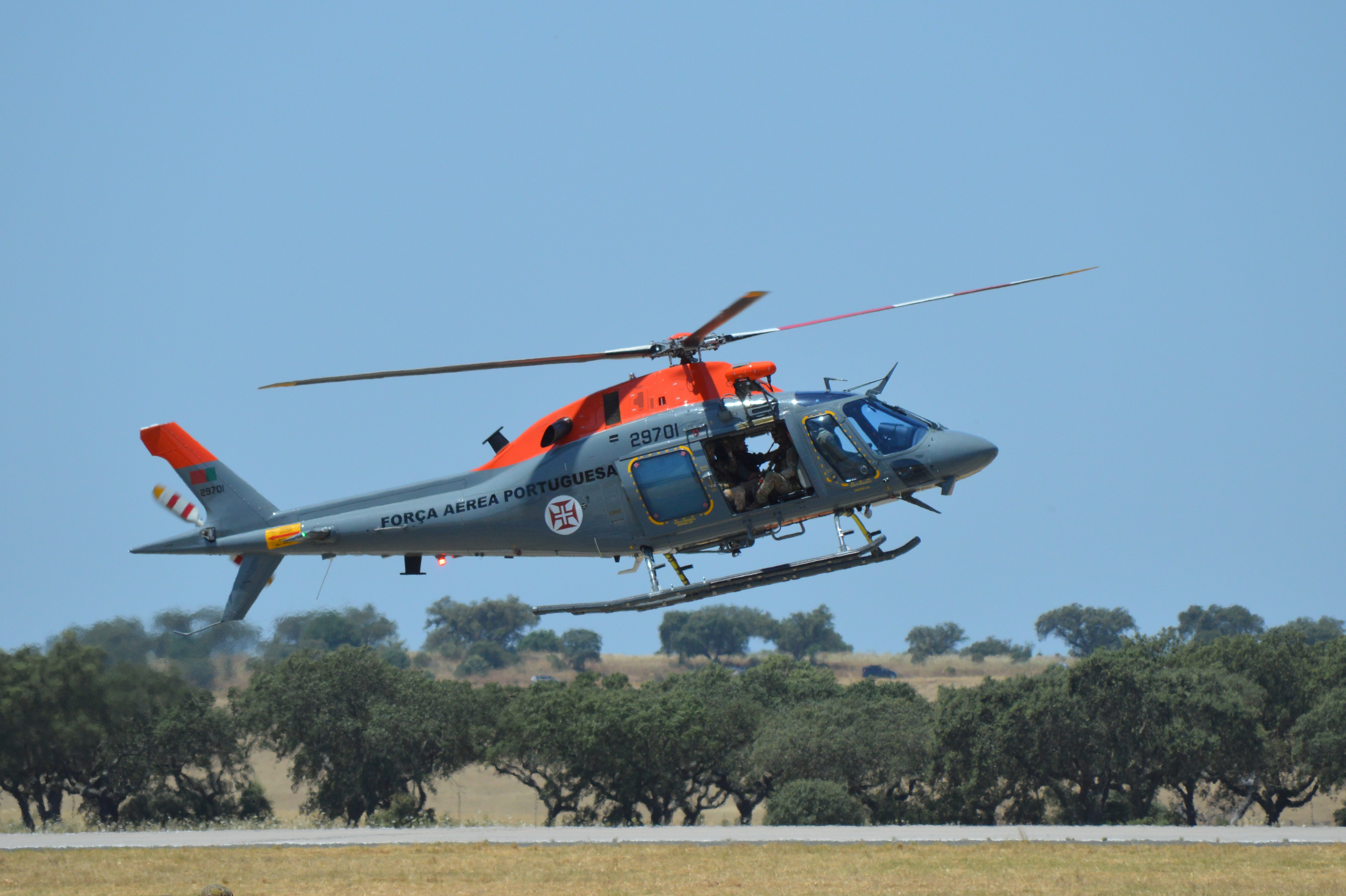
- AW119 helicopter from Portuguese Air Force 552 Squadron
- Active: 28 November 1978
- Country: Portugal
- Branch: Portuguese Air Force
- Type: Helicopter
- Role: Tactical air transport
- Size: 82 military and one civilian personnel
- Garrison/HQ: Air Base No. 11
- Nickname: Zangões (Drones)
- Mottos: "...Em perigos e guerras esforçados... " (Hardworking in dangers and wars)
- Mascot: Drone
- Website: Esquadra 552

Commanders
- Commander: Lt. Col. Carlos José Serrano Paulino

Aircraft flown
- Helicopter: AgustaWestland AW119

552 Squadron "Zangões" (Esquadra 552) is a transport helicopter squadron of the Portuguese Air Force (PoAF). Its based at Air Base No. 11 (Portuguese: Base Aérea Nº 11, BA11), at Beja, and operates the AgustaWestland AW119 in transport and helicopter instruction roles.

== Mission ==
It has the primary mission of executing tactical air transport operations and the secondary missions of providing basic and complementary flying training in helicopters, providing combat air support, executing general air transport operations and executing search and rescue operations.

In addition to providing helicopter instruction for the Air Force, the squadron also has trained pilots of the Navy's helicopter squadron and pilots and ground crews of the Army's UALE.

== History ==
Created on 24 November 1978, the 552 Squadron has inherited the traditions of all former Portuguese Air Force squadrons that operated the Sud Aviation Alouette III.

After the Carnation Revolution a major reorganization occurred in the Portuguese Armed Forces with many helicopters squadrons returning from the oversea colonies and being assigned to 33 Squadron based at Air Base No. 3 (BA3) and to the Helicopter Group (Portuguese: Grupo de Helicópteros) of Air Base No. 6 (BA6). In 1978 another reorganization in the Air Force lead to the renaming of the 301 Operational Group (Portuguese: Grupo Operacional 301) to 301 Operational Group, with the new formed 111 Squadron – dedicated to Aviocar and Alouette III training – and 552 Squadron, and the 61 Operational Group (Portuguese: Grupo Operacional 61, GO61), with the 551 Squadron (Alouette III) and 751 Squadron (Sud Aviation Puma).

Upon its creation 552 Squadron's primary missions was tactical air transport, airborne operations, medical evacuation, special operations, and logistic air support, as well the secondary missions of general air transport and offensive operations of close air support. In 1982, the Rotores de Portugal helicopter flight demonstration team was reactivated in 552 Sqn. with two helicopters, having the team been originally integrated in 33 Squadron when created in April 1976. During the early 1990s the team was integrated with 111 Sqn., operating three helicopters.

With the disbandment of 551 Squadron in October 1986, all personnel and helicopters of that squadron are transferred to the 552 Squadron, which also receives from that squadron the secondary mission of search and rescue (SAR). 552 Sqn. also inherited the SAR detachment then maintained by 551 Sqn. at Maneuvers Airfield No. 2 (Portuguese: Aeródromo de Manobra Nº2, AM2; former Air Base No. 7, BA7), in Aveiro; this SAR detachment was later deployed to Maneuvers Airfield No. 1 (AM1) at Ovar. At this time PoAF had 26 operational helicopters.

On 18 November 1993, 552 Sqn. was moved to Air Base No. 11 (BA11), in Beja, due to the deactivation of BA3 on 29 December 1993.

In 2005, the Rotores de Portugal were reactivated in 552 Sqn. with three helicopters.

=== Lineage ===
- Constituted as Esquadra 33 (33 Squadron) in 1970

Disbanded in 1978

- Reformed as Esquadra de Transporte Táctico 552 (552 Tactical Transport Squadron) on 28 November 1978

Re-designated: Esquadra 552 (552 Squadron) in October 1986

== See also ==
- Portuguese Air Force
- Portuguese Colonial War
- Rotores de Portugal
- Exercise Real Thaw
