= 101 Squadron (Portugal) =

- Esquadra 101
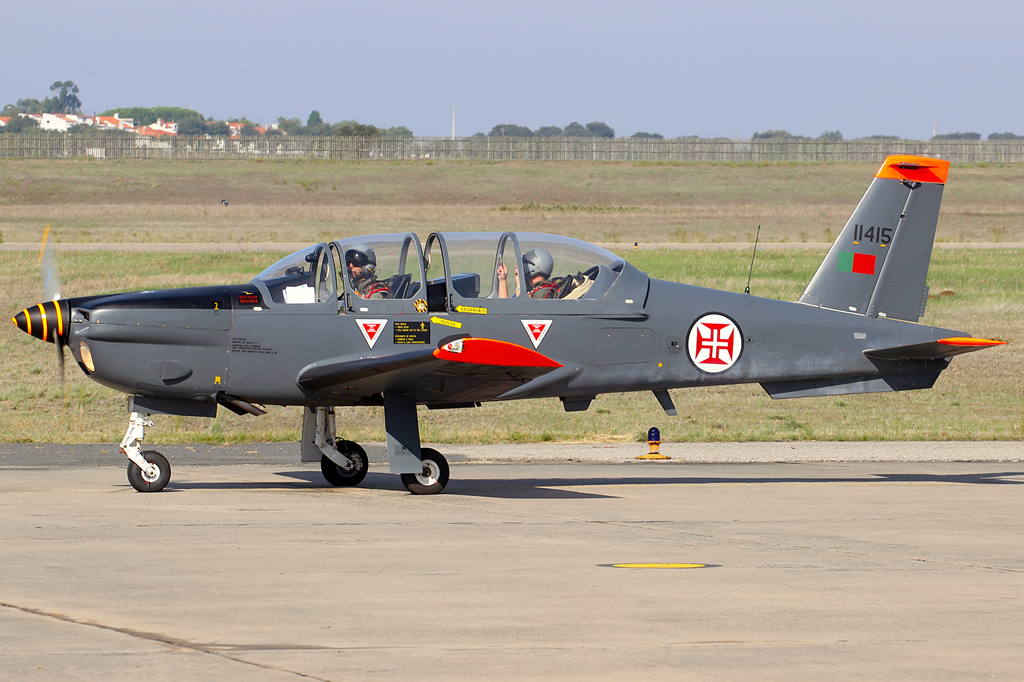
- Epsilon TB-30 of the Portuguese Air Force
- Active: 1978
- Country: Portugal
- Branch: Portuguese Air Force
- Role: Flight training
- Nickname: Roncos (Roars)
- Motto: ...Ensinando os Princípios da Arte (Teaching the Art's Beginnings)
- Decorations: Medalha de Ouro de Serviços Distintos
- Website: Esquadra 101

Commanders
- Commander: Major Telmo Martins

Aircraft flown
- Trainer: Socata TB 30 Epsilon

101 Squadron "Roncos" (Esquadra 101) is a flight training squadron of the Portuguese Air Force (PoAF), based at Sintra Air Base (BA1), with the mission of providing elementary and basic flight training.

== History ==
Created in April 1978 as result of a reorganization of the PoAF, the squadron took command of all material and human resources of the then-disbanded 21 Squadron (former Portuguese: Esquadra de Instrução Elementar de Pilotagem, E.I.E.P.), based at Ota Air Base (BA2) and equipped with the de Havilland Canada DHC-1 Chipmunk. As such, the squadron also inherited all flight training traditions and history of the Portuguese military aviation that was developed since 1916.

In October 1989, the squadron is equipped with newly acquired Aérospatiale Epsilon TB-30 and is transferred to Sintra Air Base (BA1) until June 15, 1993, when it is transferred to Beja Air Base (BA11). It's that same year, in 1989, that the squadron receives the additional mission of providing basic flight instruction, thus effectively replacing the former E.I.B.P. (Portuguese: Esquadra de Instrução Básica de Pilotagem) and starting to also take over some of the missions of 102 Squadron.

In 2009, the squadron is transferred back to Sintra Air Base (BA1)

The squadron currently is equipped with and operates an Epsilon TB-30 flight simulator. As part of an agreement between the PoAF and Portuguese Navy, pilots of the Naval Aviation also undergo flight training with 101 Squadron.

== Aircraft ==
- DHC-1 Chipmunk (1978–1989)
- Aérospatiale Epsilon TB-30 (1989–present)
- A-29N Super Tucano (2025-present)

== See also ==
- Portuguese Air Force
- Phases of aircraft training
- Portuguese Air Force Academy
- Portuguese Naval Aviation
- Portuguese Army Light Aviation Unit
- 103 Squadron
