= 102nd Squadron (Portugal) =

102 Squadron
- Esquadra 102
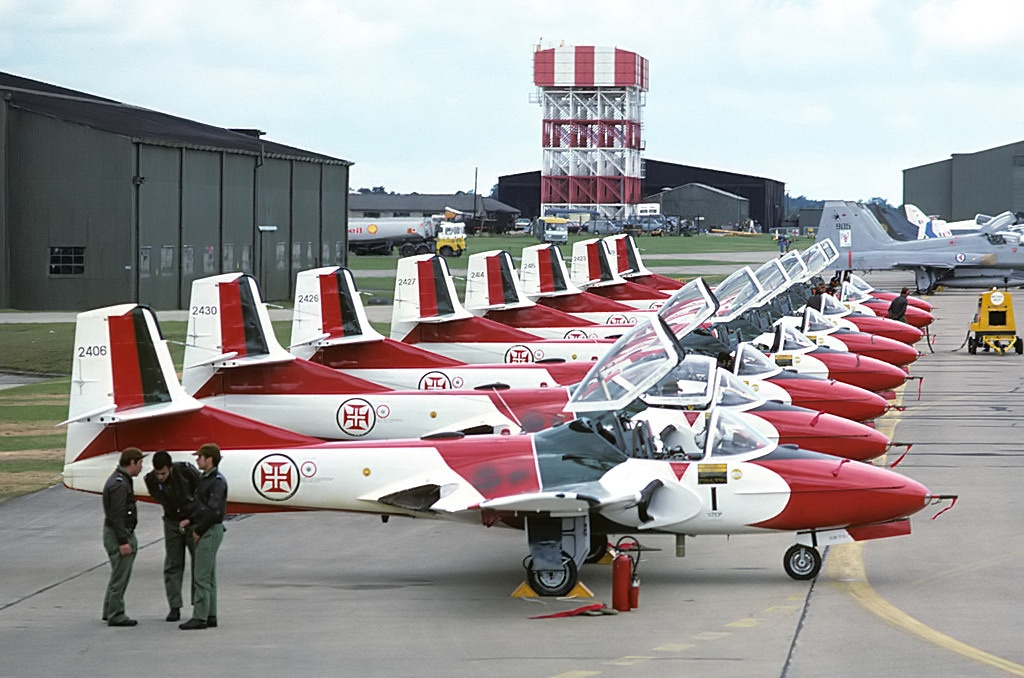
- T-37C aircraft of the Asas de Portugal display team, part of 102 Squadron
- Active: 1963–92
- Disbanded: August 8, 1992
- Country: Portugal
- Branch: Portuguese Air Force
- Role: Flight training
- Part of: Operational Group 11 (1977–1992)
- Garrison/HQ: Air Base No. 1 (1964–1977); Air Base No. 11 (1977–1992)
- Nickname: Panchos

Aircraft flown
- Trainer: Cessna T-37 Tweet

102 Squadron "Panchos" (Esquadra 102) was an elementary flight training squadron of the Portuguese Air Force disbanded in 1992. Formed in 1962, the squadron administered air force training and performed at air shows throughout Portugal. Between 1963 and its disbandment in 1992, the squadron lost nine pilots.

== History ==
The squadron's heritage began in the early 1960s when Basic Flight Instruction Squadron No. 2 (Portuguese: Esquadra de Instrução Básica de Pilotagem Nº 2, E.I.B.P. 2), "Os Panchos", was constituted at Air Base No. 1 (Portuguese: Base Aérea Nº 1, BA1), flying the Cessna T-37 Tweet entering service with the Portuguese Air Force (PoAF). Together with Basic Flight Instruction Squadron No. 1 (Portuguese: Esquadra de Instrução Básica de Pilotagem Nº 1, E.I.B.P. 1), which flew the North American T-6, formed the Basic Flight Training Group (Portuguese: Grupo de Instrução Básica de Pilotagem, G.I.B.P.).

The first twelve T-37C aircraft arrived in December 1962 as kits and were assembled at the OGMA workshops in February 1963. The remaining 18 aircraft arrived in batches of six, with the deliveries taking place in March 1964, June 1964, and the last six in January 1965.

=== Activation ===
The squadron (E.I.B.P. 2) was assigned the flight instruction of the aeronautic flight course's students of the Military Academy and was divided into two flights (Portuguese: esquadrilhas): Esquadrilha n° 1, "Feras" (Beasts), and Esquadrilha n° 2, "Águias" (Eagles). Later it was also assigned the role of instructing the basic flight courses, at first alongside E.I.B.P. 1, which was later transferred to Air Base No. 7 (Portuguese: Base Aérea Nº 7, BA7.

In 1964, the squadron formed and started to train a new air force flight demonstration team called the "Panchos" with the objective of performing a demonstration at a festival in Alverca in July of the same year. However, the demonstration was canceled and the team was inactivated after an accident during a training exercise resulted in the loss of an aircraft and the death of the pilot.

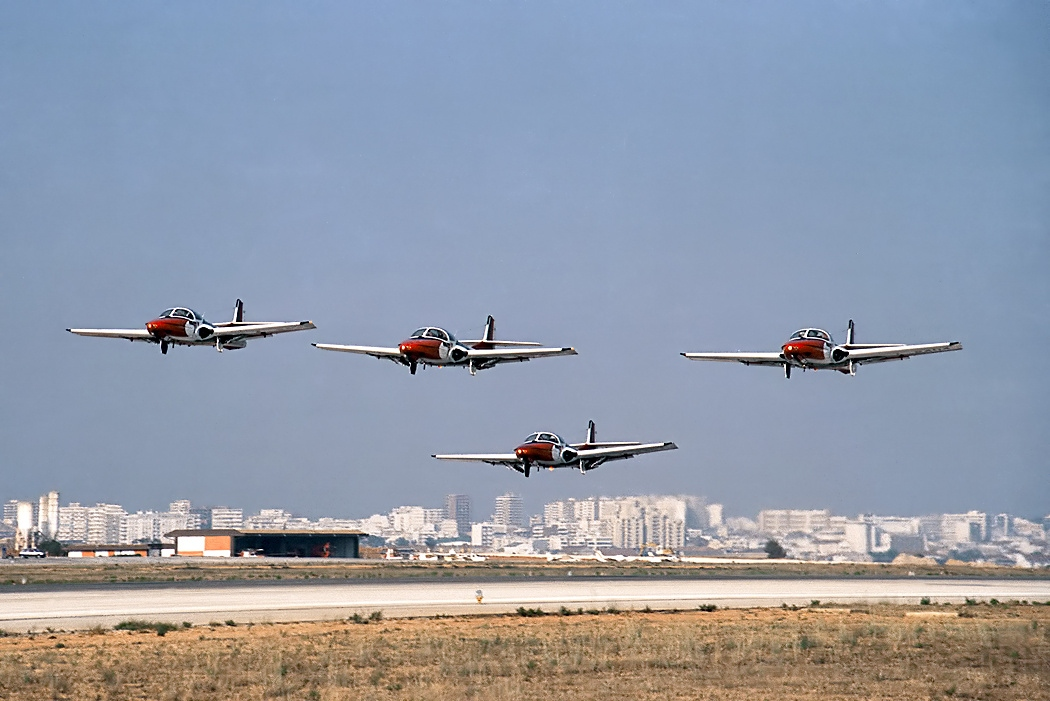
Portuguese Air Force T-37C in formation

Upon reactivation the following year, the demonstration team continued its training and started to perform at air shows. In 1969, the team's name was changed to "Diabos Vermelhos" (Red Devils). The number of demonstrations was increased. In 1970 the team was inactivated during the Colonial War.

The flight demonstration team was temporarily reactivated in 1973, as "Os Panchos", to perform at the commemoration of the centennial birth of Alberto Santos-Dumont. In 1976 the team was reactivated and in 1977 the Portuguese Air Force officially established the flight demonstration team Asas de Portugal as the national aerobatic flying team.

In 1977 the squadron was re-designated as 102 Squadron and transferred to Air Base No. 11 (Portuguese: Base Aérea Nº 11, BA11) as part of the reorganization of the Air Force's operational structure of 1978 and became the only squadron to administer basic flight training.

The squadron was disbanded on August 8, 1992, when the T-37C was officially retired from service.

=== Losses ===
On February 3, 1964, the first crash of a PoAF T-37C occurred, killing both pilots. Between November 10, 1964, and December 9, 1990, six more crashes took place and caused the loss of seven more pilots.

=== Lineage ===
- Constituted as Esquadra de Instrução Básica de Pilotagem Nº 2 in 1963
  Re-designated as Esquadra 102 in 1977
- Disbanded on August 8, 1992

== See also ==
- Portuguese Air Force
- List of aircraft of the Portuguese Air Force
- Asas de Portugal
- 101 Squadron
- 103 Squadron

== Bibliography ==
- "T-37C Um legado da memória" (PDF). Mais Alto (in Portuguese) (401). Lisbon: Portuguese Air Force: 13–17. January–February 2013.
- Cardoso, Adelino (2000). Aeronaves Militares Portuguesas no Século XX. Lisbon: Essencial.
