= 601 Squadron (Portugal) =

Air force squadron and its operations

- Esquadra 601
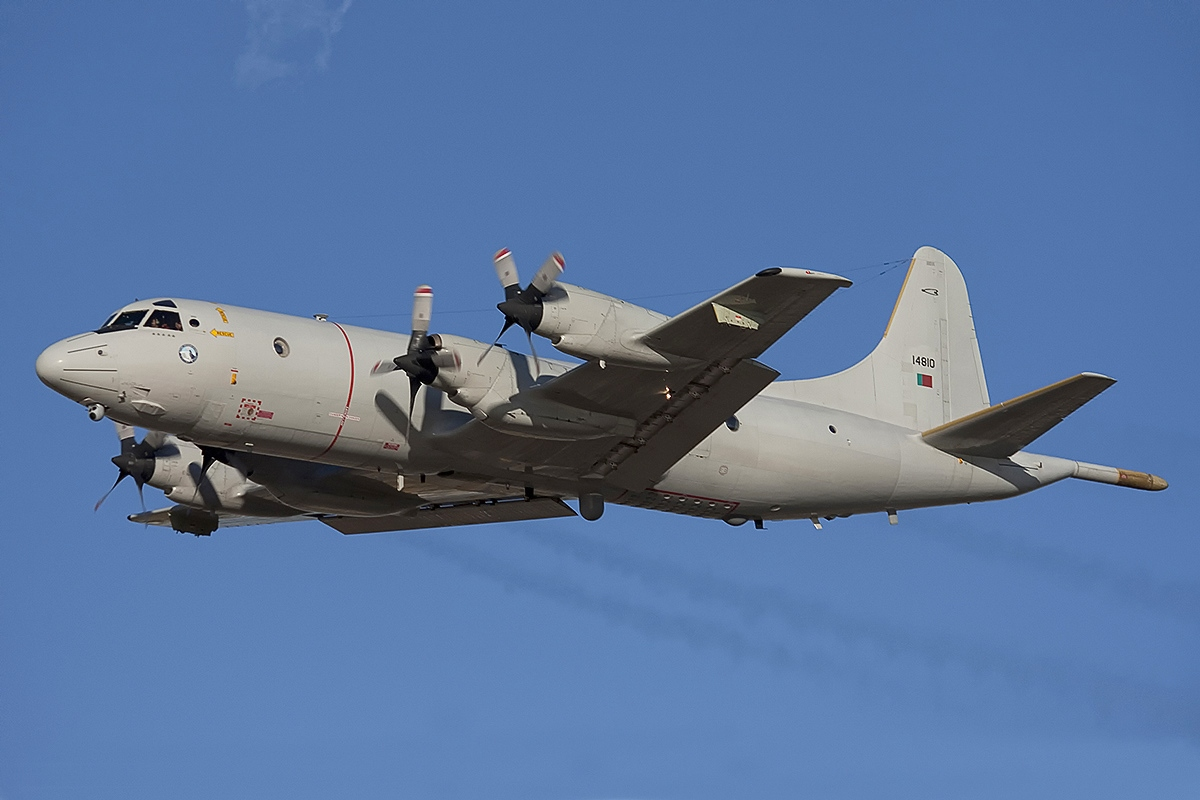
- P-3C CUP+ aircraft from 601 Sqn.
- Active: March 1986
- Country: Portugal
- Branch: Portuguese Air Force
- Role: Maritime patrol, anti-submarine and anti-surface warfare
- Part of: Operational Group 11
- Garrison/HQ: Air Base No. 11
- Nickname: Lobos (Wolves)
- Motto: «Ser-lhe-á todo o oceano obediente» (All the ocean shall it be obedient)
- Mascot: Gray wolf
- Website: Esquadra 601

Commanders
- Commander: Maj. Hélder Bruno de Sousa Ferreira

Aircraft flown
- Patrol: Lockheed P-3 Orion

601 Squadron "Lobos" (Esquadra 601) is a maritime patrol and anti-submarine warfare squadron of the Portuguese Air Force (PoAF), currently based at Beja Air Base. It operates the Lockheed P-3C CUP+ Orion.

== Roles and missions ==
The squadron's main mission is the maritime patrol, as well as both the anti-submarine (ASW) and anti-surface warfare (ASuW). It also has assigned search and rescue (SAR), and mine laying as its secondary missions.

== History ==
Officially formed in March 1986, 601 Squadron's creation originated from the acquisition of six former-Royal Australian Air Force P-3B Orion aircraft by Portugal. These six aircraft were upgraded by Lockheed and OGMA and re-designated as aircraft of the P-3P variant.

Portugal had lacked a dedicated aircraft for maritime patrol and anti-submarine warfare since 1977, when its fleet of Lockheed P-2 Neptune was retired and 61 Squadron was disbanded. As such, until the entry in service of the P-3 Orion, the Portuguese Air Force relied on CASA C-212 Aviocar aircraft, from 401 and 502 Squadron, and on Lockheed C-130 Hercules aircraft, from 501 Squadron, for maritime patrol and SAR missions. 601 Squadron is the heir of the traditions of the PoAF's previous maritime patrol squadrons, mainly 61 Squadron, 62 Squadron, and 91 Squadron.

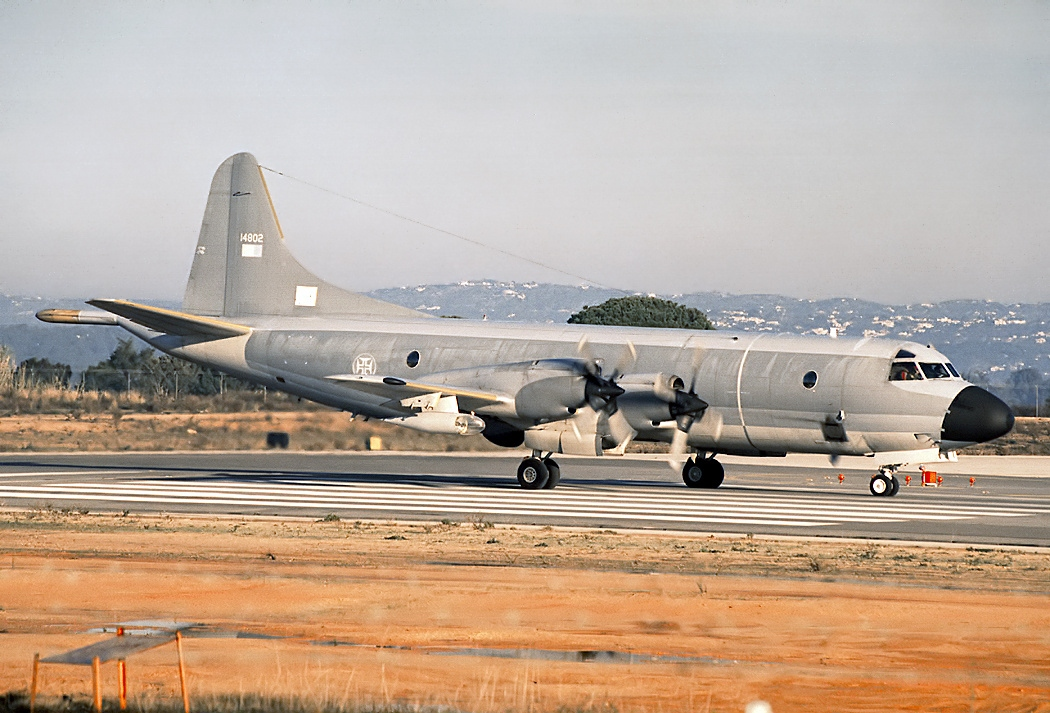
A P-3P Orion (s/n 14802) at Faro Airport in 1994

On August 7, 1988, the first P-3P was delivered at Air Base No. 6 (Portuguese: Base Aérea Nº 6, BA6), at Montijo, Portugal, where the squadron was based. For the next two years all of the squadron's activity was dedicated to the training and qualification by Lockheed of the air crews. After 1990 the squadron was certified to instruct and certify as instructors its own personnel.

The squadron participated in Operation Sharp Guard, which occurred from June 1993 to October 1996, in the blockade of Yugoslavia, having performed 576 missions and a total of 3,712 flight hours.

In June 1998, with the start of the Guinea-Bissau Civil War, 601 Squadron supported the evacuation of Portuguese and other foreign nationals from Guinea-Bissau by the Portuguese Armed Forces.

Since 2003 the squadron also participates in Operation Active Endeavour, in the surveillance and control of illegal shipping in the Mediterranean Sea.

In June 2007, a squadron's P-3P operated from Malta in support of Frontex.

On February 19, 2008, the squadron was relocated to Air Base No. 11 (Portuguese: Base Aérea Nº 11, BA11), in Beja.

From April 22, 2010, to late August 2010, the last operational P-3P of 601 Sqn. operated from Mahé while participating in Operation Atalanta. During this mission the squadron performed 40 missions and a total of 320 flight hours.

In August 2010 the first of five P-3C Orion aircraft purchased from the Royal Netherlands Navy, to replace the six P-3P then in service with the PoAF, arrived in Beja. These aircraft were upgraded by Lockheed Martin, having been refurbished, received new wings and the Capability Upkeep Program Plus (CUP+) upgrade.

On April 17, 2011, the squadron executed its first operational deployment with the new P-3C CUP+ aircraft during Operation Ocean Shield.

On October 13, 2011, a P-3P with the serial number 14805 performed its last flight in Beja, thus also performing the last flight of the P-3P fleet in service with the air force.

Since the squadron's activation it has also participated in numerous other national and international exercises, most notably: Ocean Safari, Dogfish, Strong Resolve, Linked Seas, Noble Manta, Sharkhunt, Grampus, and Real Thaw.

== See also ==
- Anti-submarine warfare
- Portuguese Air Force
- Portuguese Naval Aviation
- List of aircraft of the Portuguese Air Force
- 401 Squadron
- 502 Squadron
- Netherlands Naval Aviation Service

== Bibliography ==
- Borst, Marco P.J. (June 2000). "The Watching Wolves of Portugal" (PDF). Maritime Patrol Aviation Magazine. VP International: 4–6.
- Rebelo, Colonel Hélder Martins; Rocha, Major Rui; Martins, Major Vítor Lazera (November–December 2012). "ISR - Intelligence, Surveillance and Reconnaissance" (PDF). Mais Alto (in Portuguese) (400). Lisbon: Portuguese Air Force: 5–16.
