= Asas de Portugal =

Wings of Portugal
- Asas de Portugal
- Asas de Portugal team emblem
- Active: 1977–1990; 1997–1998; 2001; 2005–2010
- Country: Portugal
- Branch: Portuguese Air Force
- Role: Aerobatic display team
- Size: 2 Pilots; 8 Support
- Air Base: Air Base No. 11

Aircraft flown
- Trainer: (1977–1992) Cessna T-37 (1997–2010) Dassault/Dornier Alpha

The Asas de Portugal (lit. 'Wings of Portugal') was a flight demonstration team created in 1977 integrated with Esquadra 103 (103 Squadron) of the Portuguese Air Force. It was Portugal's national aerobatic flying team and flew two ex-German Air Force Dassault-Breguet/Dornier Alpha Jets.

== History ==
In 1977, Asas de Portugal was created by order of the Air Force Chief of Staff (CEMFA), with the objective to represent the Portuguese Air Force (PoAF) at the International Air Tattoo air festival. This was the third aerobatics team established by the PoAF, after two teams of the 1950s — the Dragões (Dragons) and the São Jorge (Saint George) teams.

Asas de Portugal operated the Cessna T-37C for 13 years while integrated with the 102 Squadron Panchos.

The single fatal accident in the team's history occurred on 9 December 1990, when one of its T-37Cs suffered a catastrophic wing structural failure during a practice session, killing team pilot José Magalhães da Costa. The accident prompted a fleet-wide inspection which revealed that all but five T-37 aircraft in the PoAF inventory suffered from fatigue induced micro-cracks in the wings' structure. Repairs to airworthy status were considered financially inadvisable. This conclusion, together with a restructure of the PoAF in the 1990s, led to the phase-out of the T-37 and an interruption of the team's activities.

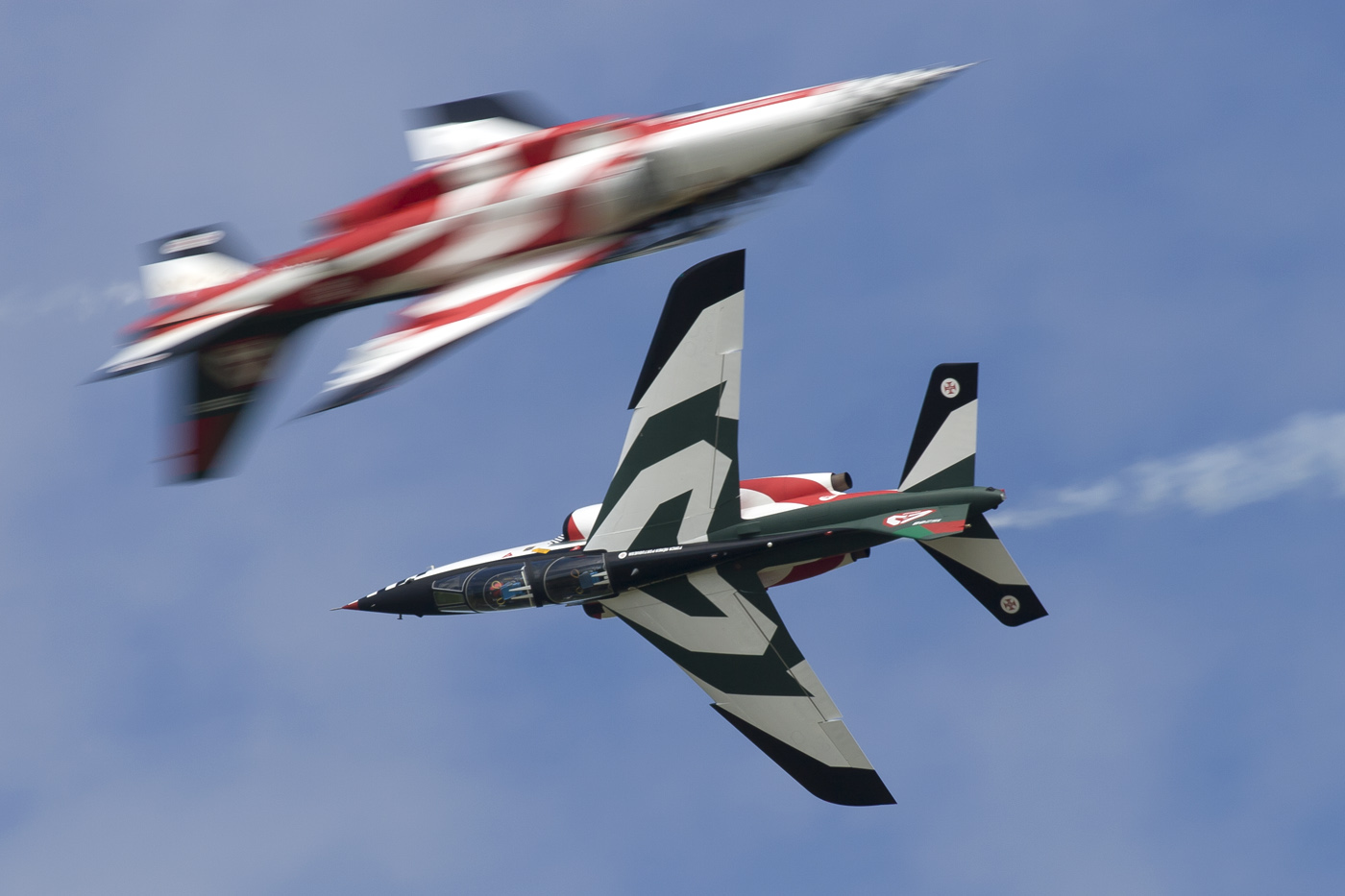
Two Alpha Jets performing in 2006

In 1997 the team was reactivated, being integrated with the 103 Squadron Caracóis and equipped with Dassault-Breguet/Dornier Alpha Jet aircraft, having a team of seven officer pilots and a maintenance team. The first public appearance with the Alpha Jet was on June 27, 1997, at the commemorations of the PoAF's 45th anniversary in Sintra.

In 1998, the team was deactivated for logistics reasons.

On the occasion of the PoAF's 50th anniversary in 2001, the responsibility to prepare an Alpha Jet flight demonstration for the commemorations was given to 103 Squadron. This resulted in the creation of a two-aircraft display team that represented Portugal with a 16-minute sequence of maneuvers in those commemorations, leading to the idea and plan of expanding the display.

In 2005, the Asas de Portugal were definitively reactivated, being once again integrated with 103 Squadron, based at Beja Air Base. The team was deactivated again in 2010, before the start of the airshow season.

== See also ==
- Rotores de Portugal
