= 103 Squadron (Portugal) =

- Esquadra 103
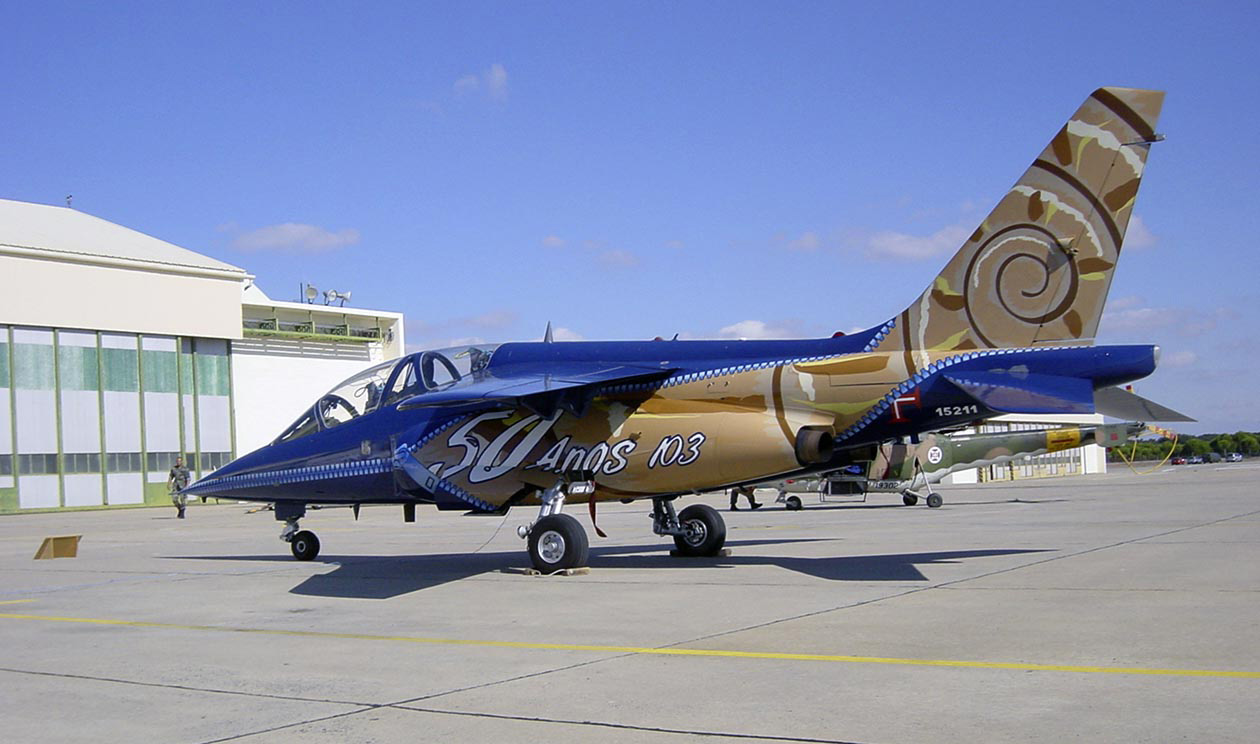
- Alpha Jet with commemorative painting of the 50th anniversary of 103 Squadron
- Active: 1953
- Country: Portugal
- Branch: Air Force
- Role: Advanced Flight training / Fighter Conversion
- Part of: Operational Group 111
- Air Base: Air Base No. 11
- Nickname: Caracóis (Snails)
- Motto: ...Se vai ao longe ([Slowly]...you go far)
- Mascot: Snail

Commanders
- Current commander: None

Insignia
- Badge: Snail with a helmet as its shell

Aircraft flown
- Trainer: Lockheed T-33 Shooting Star (1953–1991); Northrop T-38 Talon (1980–1993); Dassault/Dornier Alpha Jet (1993–2018)

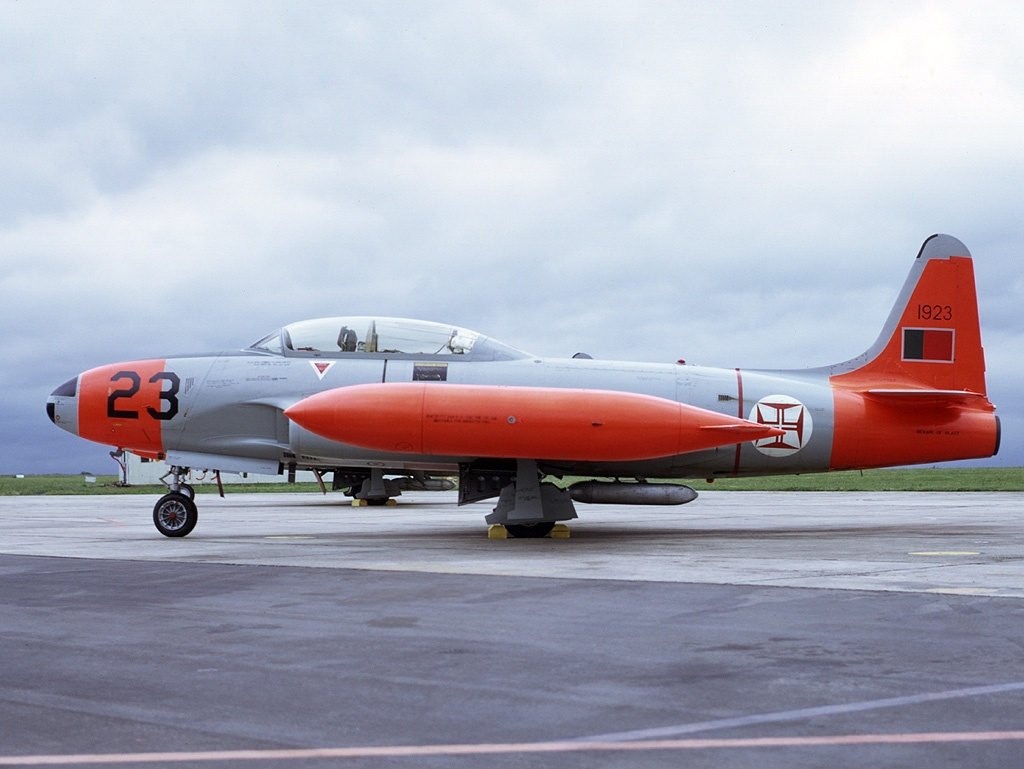
Former T-33 Shooting Star of the 103 Squadron

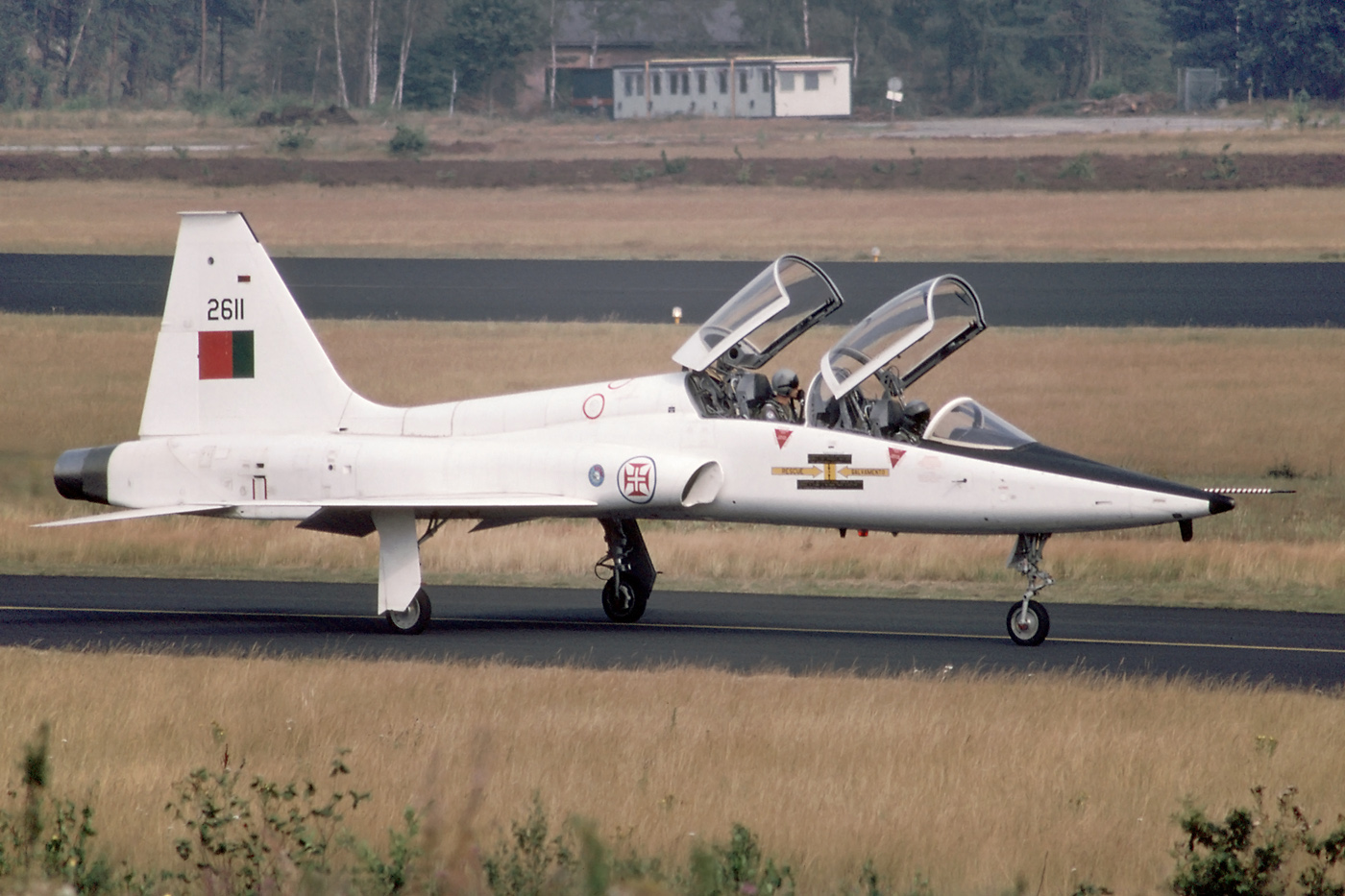
Former T-38 Talon of the 103 Squadron

The 103 Squadron "Caracóis" (Esquadra 103) is a jet advanced training squadron of the Portuguese Air Force. Prior to 1978, the "Caracóis" also received following designations: 22 Squadron, Esquadra de Instrução Complementar de Pilotagem (EICP) and Esquadra de Instrução Complementar de Pilotagem em Aviões de Combate (EICPAC).

== Roles and missions ==
Its primary mission is the complementary flying training on jet aircraft and operational transition training.

== History ==
The origins of 103 Squadron date back to 1953 with the beginning of the operational service of the Lockheed T-33A Shooting Star and later that same year with the delivery of the first jet fighters, the Republic F-84G Thunderjet, in service with the Portuguese Air Force (PoAF). These aircraft were assigned to then-Air Base No. 2 (BA2), Ota, to equip the first jet fighter squadron, 20 Squadron. That same year a new Flight (Esquadrilha de Voo sem Visibilidade, VSV) was created and integrated in 20 Squadron to train in the flight by instruments and the operational conversion on a twin-seat jet of the new pilots for the single-seat F-84. With the formation of a second jet fighter squadron, 21 Squadron, in 1954, the VSV Flight became more independent.

In 1955, 22 Squadron, the third squadron of the 201st Operational Group of Air Base No. 2, was created and equipped with the totality of the existing T-33 fleet and a small detachment of F-84G – resulting in the T-33A being finally assigned to an independent squadron of its own. The primary mission of this squadron was to provide the conversion and transition training for jet fighters to pilots who had experience with conventional aircraft, like the Republic F-47D Thunderbolt and Curtiss SB2C Helldiver. This training consisted of about 40 hours of flight in basic flying, acrobatic flying, formation, flight by instruments, navigation, and night flight, and also the conversion to the F-84G before the pilots were assigned to an operational fighter squadron.

In 1956, with the complete conversion of the pilots of the last conventional fighter squadron, the 22 Squadron mission was changed from the conversion of pilots to jet fighters, to the instruction of pilots, thus adopting the new designation of Pilot Complementary Instruction Squadron (Portuguese: Esquadra de Instrução Complementar de Pilotagem, EICP).

In August 1957, the squadron was then transferred to then-Air Base No. 3 (BA3) and assigned to the PoAF's Directorate of Instruction (DINST). The trainee-pilots where then transferred directly from the Pilot Basic Instruction Squadron (Portuguese: Esquadra de Instrução Básica de Pilotagem, EIBP), which was equipped with the North American T-6 Texan. The training in T-33A also was changed from 40 to 80 hours of flight and trips of navigation instruction to other countries were added.

On December, due to logistic-administrative reasons, the EICP adopted the designation of Combat Aircraft Piloting Complementary Instruction Squadron (Portuguese: Esquadra de Instrução Complementar de Pilotagem de Aviões de Combate, EICPAC), so that the subsidy of operational pilots in jet aircraft was also attributed to the squadron's instructors, also adding to the instruction subsidy.

In September 1960, the squadron was transferred back to Ota, and with the disbandment of the 20 and 21 Squadrons, the entire F-84G fleet was also assigned to EICPAC. This resulted in the squadron being organized in two independent Flights, having only the command of the squadron as common between them. The T-33 Flight continued with the mission of complementary instruction while the F-84 Flight had as mission the operational conversion of pilots for the North American F-86F Sabre. However, with the beginning of the conflict in Africa, the F-84 were transferred to new squadrons in the colonies, along with many of its pilot-instructors.

In November 1974, the squadron was transferred to Air Base No. 5, in Monte Real; by then with more than 90 hours of flight training.

In 1978, with the organic restructure of the Air Force, the squadron's designation is changed to 103 Squadron, while not losing the previous designation of EICPAC.

During July 1980, 103 Squadron started to receive the Northrop T-38A Talon, until then operated by 201 Squadron. This resulted in the EICPAC being organized, for the second time, in two independent flights. The T-38 flight was dependent of the Operational Command (COFA) while the T-33 flight continued under the command of the DINST.

In 1987, 103 Squadron was transferred to Air Base No. 11, in Beja. In January 1990, the Operational Introduction Course (Portuguese: Curso de Introdução Operacional, CIO) is implemented in the T-38 Flight, to provide operational introduction to the pilots trained in the United States, helping in their integration with the combat squadrons.

With the beginning of the retirement of the T-33 in 1988, the T-38 started replacing it in the main course of complementary instruction of combat aircraft. By 1991 the retirement of the T-33 was completed.

In 1993, Germany transferred 50 Dassault/Dornier Alpha Jets to Portugal as part payment for German use of Beja Air Base. In June 1993, the T-38 was retired and in November 103 Squadron started its first course on the Alpha Jet. In 1997 the aerobatic team Asas de Portugal reformed with six Alpha Jets as part of 103 Squadron, but the team only carried out two displays before disbanding. A two-aircraft Alpha Jet team, the Parelha da Cruz de Christo (the Cross of Christ Pair) was operated by the squadron in 2001 to celebrate the 50th anniversary of the Portuguese Air Force, and the Asas de Portugal was reformed as part of 103 Squadron in 2004, continuing to operate until 2010. The number of Alpha Jets operated by the squadron gradually reduced as aircraft used up their flying hours, and by 2017 only 6 Alpha Jets were operational. The Alpha Jet was retired on 13 January 2018.

== Aircraft ==
- Republic F-84G Thunderjet (1955–1957 at Esquadra 22; 1960–1962 at EIPAC)
- Lockheed T-33A Shooting Star (1953–1991)
  Lockheed RT-33A Shooting Star
  Canadair T-33AN Silver Star
- Northrop T-38A Talon (1980–1993)
- Dassault/Dornier Alpha Jet (1993–2018)
- Embraer A-29N Super Tucano (2025-present)

== Commanders ==
List of commanders of the 103 Squadron since the squadron's transference from Ota to Monte Real, in November 1974.

- Major PILAV Sérgio Carrilho da Silva Pinto (September 1974 – January 1975)
- Captain PILAV José Arnaut Monroy (January 1975 – June 1975)
- Major PILAV José Vizela Cardoso (June 1975 – January 1979)
- Major PILAV Manuel Taveira Martins (January 1979 – May 1982)
- Major PILAV António Martins de Matos (May 1982 – August 1985)
- Major PILAV António Morgado (August 1985 – November 1987)
- Major PILAV José Ramos Tareco (November 1987 – September 1990)
- Major PILAV João Cordeiro (September 1990 – June 1992)
- Major PILAV António Afonso Allen Revez (July 1992 – March 1995)
- Major PILAV Joaquim Rodrigues Bentes (March 1995 – September 1997)
- Major PILAV Jorge Dias Teixeira (September 1997 – September 1998)
- Major PILAV Francisco da Costa Rovisco (September 1998 – March 1999)
- Major PILAV António Nascimento (March 1999 – September 2000)
- Major PILAV Teodorico Dias Lopes (September 2000 – June 2003)
- Major PILAV José Alves Gaspar (July 2003 – February 2006)
- Major PILAV Rui de Jesus Romão (February 2006 – May, 2007)
- Major PILAV João Nunes Vicente (May, 2007 – Jun, 2008)
- Major PILAV Rui Mendes (Jun, 2008 – Dec, 2009)
- Major PILAV Afonso Gaiolas (Dec, 2009 – May, 2010)
- TCor PILAV Eugénio Rocha (May, 2010– July, 2013)
- Captain PILAV Coelho da Silva (July, 2013 – March 2015)
- Captain PILAV David Fernandes (Mar, 2015 – Apr, 2016)
- Major PILAV Paulo Campos (Apr, 2016 – Jan, 2018)

== See also ==
- Flight military unit
- Phases of aircraft training
- Portuguese Air Force
- Portuguese Air Force Academy
- 20 Squadron
- 101 Squadron
- 102 Squadron
- 301 Squadron
- Asas de Portugal
- List of aircraft of the Portuguese Air Force
