= Tactical air control party =

Military team coordinating close air support

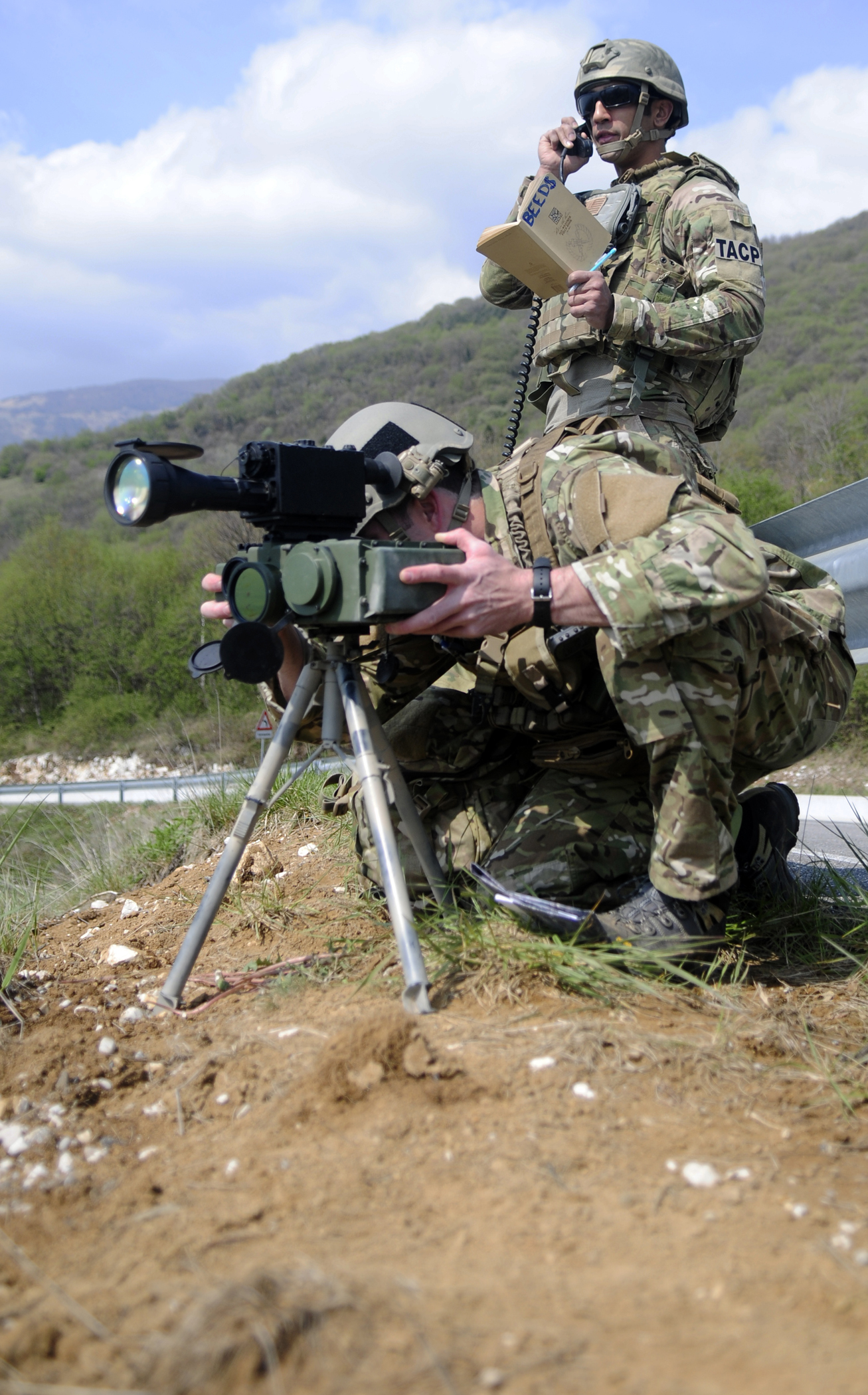
USAF Tactical Air Control Party operators using a SOFLAM during training in 2012

A tactical air control party, commonly abbreviated TACP, is a small team of military personnel who provide coordination between aircraft and ground forces when providing close air support.

== Australia ==
Australian TACPs are provided by the RAAF and are responsible for the coordination of air assets in support of deployed Army units.

== Canada ==
The Royal Canadian Air Force TACP is the principal air liaison and control element aligned with land force manoeuvre units from battlegroup to corps. The TACP is responsible to the JFACC and responsive to the designated supported commander who is usually the ground commander; two primary responsibilities:

- The TACP advises the ground commander on aerospace matters and enable the safe, effective, and efficient integration of aerospace capabilities with surface forces to achieve the tasks, missions, intent, and desired end state.
- The TACP also provides an intermediate-level aerospace C2 capability for airspace and aerospace assets and enable the safe, effective, and efficient execution of aerospace operations at the tactical level.

In Sep 2006, a USAF A-10A conducting CAS controlled by a Canadian JTAC strafed Canadian soldiers, killing Canadian Army private Mark Anthony Graham and wounding several others. A board of inquiry was created to investigate the fratricide, discovering several deficiencies in regards to JTAC training and equipment that contributed to it. Resulting from the investigation, the Air-Land Integration Cell was established in 2007 to provide national standards for JTACs, the creation of the RCAF TACPs, and adequate capability management.

== United Kingdom ==
In the United Kingdom Armed Forces, TACP personnel may come from the Royal Marines, Army or RAF Regiment. Every TACP has four members; one officer and one senior NCO, who are trained forward air controllers (FACs), and two signallers (junior NCOs), who are responsible for communication equipment and assist in tasking aircraft to FACs in forward positions. The FAC's role is to guide attack aircraft and fast jets to the correct target by providing descriptions and locations to the pilots via a range of telecommunications equipment. FACs and TACPs in the United Kingdom are trained at the Joint Forward Air Controller Training and Standardisation Unit (JFACTSU).

Prince Harry, the fifth in line to the British throne, served as a TACP commander in Afghanistan.

== United States ==
=== Air Force TACP ===
A USAF TACP airman (AFSC 1Z3X1) integrates and operates with a conventional United States Army combat maneuver unit or special operations unit, including Special Forces Operational Detachment Alphas (ODAs), the 75th Ranger Regiment, Navy SEAL teams, and Joint Special Operations Command Tier 1 special mission units. TACPs are responsible for advising ground commanders on the best use of air power, establishing and maintaining command and control communications, and providing precision terminal attack guidance of U.S. and coalition fixed-wing and rotary-wing close air support aircraft, artillery, and naval gunfire.

=== Marine Corps FAC ===
Traditional Marine Corps infantry battalions each have an FAC, who is a Marine Corps naval aviator or naval flight officer acting liaison between their fighter/attack jets and attack helicopters and the infantry battalion. A Marine Corps FAC (7502 MOS) is commonly referred to as the air officer. Underneath him, he has two other FACs and three joint terminal attack controllers (JTACs – 8002 MOS). Ideally the three FACs (including the air officer) come from three different aviation backgrounds: one tactical jet pilot or NFO (F/A-18 or AV-8B), one tactical helicopter pilot (AH-1W or UH-1Y), and one assault support pilot (CH-46, CH-53, KC-130 or MV-22). Ideally, the three JTACs come from an artillery background (forward observer – 0861 MOS).

In addition to the three FACs and three JTACs, the infantry battalion also has eight joint fires observers (JFOs) distributed among the rifle companies.

=== Marine Corps Air and Naval Gunfire Liaison Company (ANGLICO) ===
The USMC has three active duty ANGLICO units with the sole purpose to provide a fires liaison capability to joint, coalition, and allied partner nations. This capability is scale-able from a small team to the division level. The smallest unit of an ANGLICO unit is a 4-5 marine firepower control team (FCT) composed of an officer team leader/JTAC, a team chief (forward observer/JFO/JTAC), and a radio chief (radio operator) with the rest of the team being a mix of FO/ROs. These teams can be tailored to meet the mission requirement, from just a JTAC attached to a small team to all five marines dispersed among a company-sized element for distributed fires lethality via communication. Because of the large number of units these teams work with they are usually experienced in working with various US and international CAS aircraft in all environments ranging from the jungles of south east Asia, Middle East to the Arctic Circle.

== See also ==
- Forward air control
- Land of Bad
