= São Jacinto Airfield =

Aeródromo Municipal de Aveiro São Jacinto Airfield
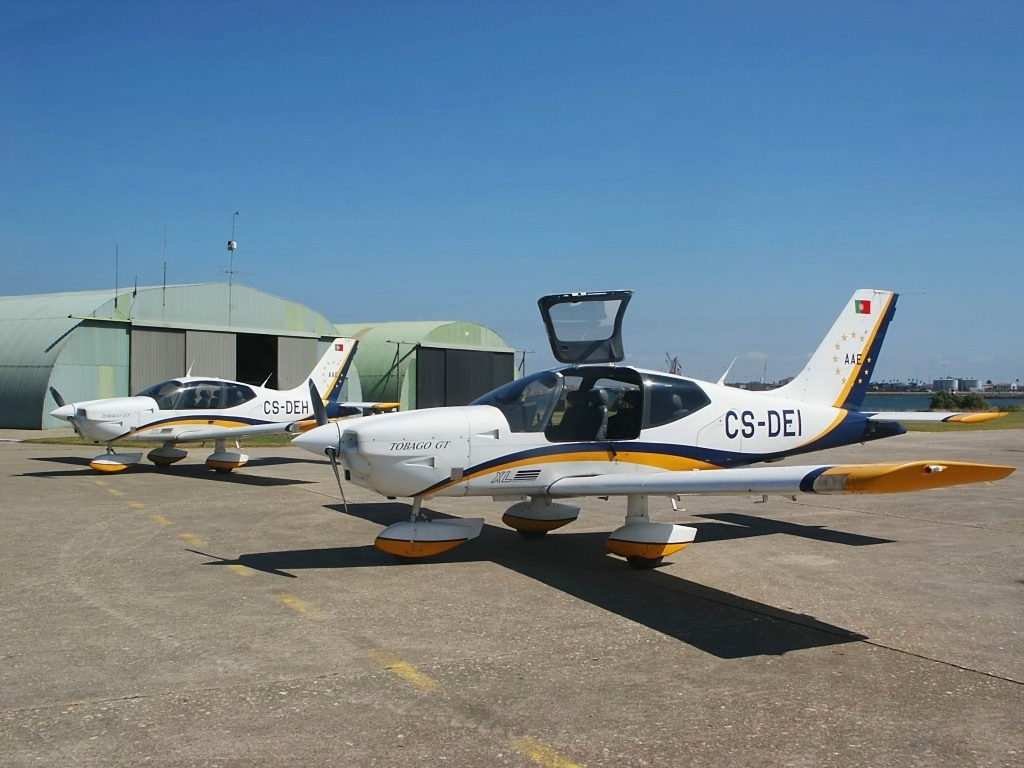
- Two Socata TB-200GTs at Aveiro
- IATA: none; ICAO: LPAV

Summary
- Airport type: Public
- Operator: Câmara Municipal de Aveiro
- Serves: Aveiro
- Elevation AMSL: 26 ft (7.9 m)
- Coordinates: 40°39′15″N 008°44′37″W
- Interactive map of Aeródromo Municipal de Aveiro; São Jacinto Airfield

Runways
| Direction | Length | | Surface |
| Direction | m | ft | Surface |
|---|---|---|---|
| 17/35 | 1,372 | 4,500 | Asphalt |

São Jacinto Airfield, officially designated Aveiro Municipal Aerodrome (Portuguese: Aeródromo Municipal de Aveiro), is an aerodrome near the city of Aveiro in Portugal. It is located on a peninsula, between the Atlantic Ocean and the Vouga River estuary, in the parish of São Jacinto, near to the harbour of Aveiro, as well as the Costa de Prata (Silver Coast) beaches. It has a single runway in the 17/35 direction and a relatively large apron and has been operated in the past by all branches of the Portuguese Armed Forces. It is home to an air club, Aeroclube de Aveiro, but is currently closed to civilian traffic due to lack of certification.

== History ==
The airfield dates back to World War I, with the creation of an anti-submarine hydroplane base by the French Naval Aviation established a base on April 1, 1918. With the end of the war the base was integrated into the Portuguese Naval Aviation and in 1927 the Admiral Gago Coutinho Naval Aviation School (Portuguese: Escola de Aviação Naval Almirante Gago Coutinho) was installed at its facilities. A runway was then constructed in 1937 to allow the operation of conventional aircraft from the base.

In 1953, with the creation of the Portuguese Air Force the previous year, the base was transferred to that branch. In 1977 the air base is deactivated and the base's garrison is then used by the Air Force's airborne troops as Airborne Troops Operational Base No. 2 (Portuguese: Base Operacional de Tropas Pára-quedistas Nº2, BOPT2) and its aviation facilities are designated as Maneuvers Airfield No. 2 (Portuguese: Aeródromo de Manobra Nº 2, AM2) until their deactivation in 1992 as an independent unit. With the integration of the airborne troops in the Army the base was re-designated S. Jacinto Military Area (Portuguese: Área Militar de S. Jacinto, AMSJ).

=== Civilian use ===
In 1993 the Air Force signed an agreement with the local government of the Aveiro Municipality, through the Aeroclube de Aveiro, to allow the use of the aviation infrastructures for civilian use. On September 4, 1993, the airfield was open to civilian traffic and was re-designated as Aveiro Municipal Aerodrome.

=== Military designations ===
Military designations
| Date | Name | Native Portuguese name | Operator |
|---|---|---|---|
| 1919–1933 | S. Jacinto Naval Aviation Centre | Centro de Aviação Naval de S. Jacinto | Portuguese Navy |
| 1933–1953 | Gago Coutinho Naval Aviation School | Escola de Aviação Naval Almirante Gago Coutinho | Portuguese Navy |
| 1953–1957 | Air Base No. 5 | Base Aérea Nº 5 (BA5) | Portuguese Air Force |
| 1957–1958 | Base Aerodrome No. 2 | Aeródromo-Base Nº 2 (AB2) | Portuguese Air Force |
| 1958–1978 | Air Base No. 7 | Base Aérea Nº 7 (BA7) | Portuguese Air Force |
| 1977–1992 | Maneuvers Airfield No. 2 | Aeródromo de Manobra Nº 2 (AM2) | Portuguese Air Force |
