= Portuguese Air Force Academy =

Coordinates: 38°50′12″N 9°20′08″W

- Academia da Força Aérea
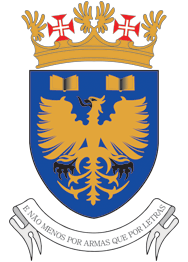
- Motto: E não menos por armas que por letras
- Motto in English: "No less by arts exalt than arms and wars" (from The Lusiads, Canto III, 13, v. 8)
- Type: Air force academy
- Established: 1 February 1978
- Commander of the AFA: Major-general pilot-aviator Fernando Manuel Lourenço da Costa
- Academic staff: 46
- Students: 184
- Location: Granja do Marquês, 2715-021 PÊRO PINHEIRO, Sintra, District of Lisbon, Portugal
- Campus: Sintra Air Base
- Website: www.emfa.pt/afa

The Portuguese Air Force Academy (AFA, Academia da Força Aérea in Portuguese) is a Portuguese military higher education institution whose aim is to provide all its students with the training and the experience that will enable them to graduate having gained the knowledge and the character qualities that are essential for leadership, and the motivation to become Portuguese Air Force officers. It comprises both university and polytechnical academic programmes.

== Academic programmes ==
=== University programmes ===
- Master in military aeronautics, Pilot-aviator (PILAV) – 5 years,
- Master in military aeronautics, Aeronautical administration (ADMAER) – 6 years,
- Master in military aeronautics, Electrical engineering (ENGEL) – 6 years,
- Master in military aeronautics, Airfield engineering (ENGAED) – 6 years,
- Master in military aeronautics, Aeronautical engineering (ENGAER) – 6 years,
- Complementary course of the master in Medicine (MED) – 3 years.

Further, AFA has doctorate (PhD) programmes in several fields.

=== Tecnichal Courses ===
- Bachelor, Navigators (NAV) – 4 years,
- Bachelor, Air Police (PA) – 4 years,
- Bachelor, Supply technician (TABST) – 4 years,
- Bachelor, Computer technician (TINF) – 4 years,
- Bachelor, Aeronautical materiel maintenance technician (TMMA) – 4 years,
- Bachelor, Equipment and armament maintenance technician (TMAEQ) – 4 years,
- Bachelor, Electronic materiel maintenance technician (TMMEL) – 4 years,
- Bachelor, Ground materiel maintenance technician (TMMT) – 4 years,
- Bachelor, Personnel and administrative support technician (TPAA) – 4 years,
- Bachelor, Air control operations technician and traffic radar operator (TOCART) – 4 years,
- Bachelor, Communications and cryptography operations technician (TOCC) – 4 years,
- Bachelor, Detection, conduct and interception operations technician (TODCI) – 4 years,
- Bachelor, Meteorological operations technician (TOMET) – 4 years.

== History ==
For many years after its creation in 1952 as an independent branch of the Armed Forces of Portugal, Portuguese Air Force officers attended the Army' Military Academy. However, military professionalization, as well as the specific nature of the qualifications required for an Air Force career officer, led to the creation of the separate Air Force Academy (AFA), in 1978.

The AFA became the third military higher education institution, alongside the Naval School and the Military Academy.

Presently, AFA has its own facilities inside Sintra Air Base (Air Base 1) area at Granja do Marquês. It started its activity though, on 1 February 1978, in temporary facilities and only students that were then attending the third year of the Military Aeronautics degree course were taken in. As its own facilities were built it became possible to expand the educational range of the academy to cover other areas of interest. Thus, in response to the real needs of the Air Force, in the school year of 1991/92 other degrees were created: aeronautical engineering, airfield engineering; electrical engineering, computer engineering and aeronautical administration. In order to get these degrees, students have to attend other higher education institutions for the final years of each course.

The polytechnical courses were created in the same year. Meant for the servicemen who also wish to enter the commissioned ranks, they are aimed at the technical personnel. These degrees were taught at the Military Aeronautical Technology College (ESTMA, Escola Superior de Tecnologias Militares e Aeronáuticas), until 2008, when this school was merged in the AFA.

== Location ==
The area of land where Sintra Air Base and the Air Force Academy are currently situated has a long history behind it. This was attested by the discovery of a grave from the Neolithic period, as well as remains of the presence of Romans and Arabs in the region. It once belonged to the military-religious orders.

In the 17th century, according to legend, there was an apparition of Our Lady of Nazaré, and the estate became known as Granja da Nazaré. Later, a chapel was built here whose construction was finished in 1701. After the Marquis of Pombal became the owner of the farm and its grange it changed its name to Granja do Marquês. In 1862, Pombal's heirs rented out the land so that the Quinta Regional de Sintra (Sintra Regional Farm) could be established.

On 5 February 1920, the Military Aviation School, which had been operating at Vila Nova da Rainha, was transferred to Granja do Marquês.

On 14 August 1926, an image of the Assumption of the Virgin was offered to the chapel. That image was renamed Our Lady of the Air, was confirmed as such in 1960 by Pope John XXIII and proclaimed "Patron Saint of Portuguese Aviators". In 1995 it would be enthroned as patron saint of all aviators.

In December 1937, Sintra Air Base was created, and two years later it would be given the name it still carries: Air Base 1 (Base Aérea 1) – the oldest base of the Portuguese Air Force.

For many years this was the place where both Air Force pilots and technicians got their training. Its most important training aircraft were the Tiger, the T-6 and the T-37. It was also the home base of the aerobatics team Asas de Portugal.

Even though it does not really belong to Sintra Air Base, AFA depends on it for support in the areas of security, transport, health care, catering and flight training.

== See also ==
- Higher education in Portugal
- Portuguese Air Force
- Portugal
