= Beja Airbase =

Military airport in Portugal

Beja Air Base Air Base 11
- Base Aérea de Beja; Base Aérea Nº 11
- Near Beja, Alentejo in Portugal
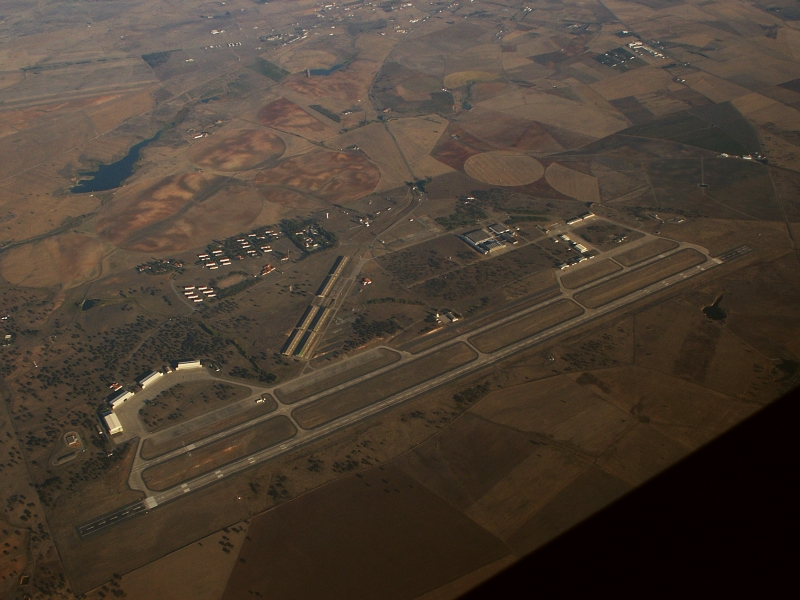
- An aerial view of Beja Airport.

- Com military engenho e sutil arte (Portuguese for 'With military ingenuity and subtle art')

Site information
- Type: Military airfield
- Owner: Ministry of National Defence
- Operator: Portuguese Air Force
- Controlled by: Air Command
- Condition: Operational
- Website: Official website

Location
- Location in Portugal
- Coordinates: 38°04′44″N 007°55′57″W
- Area: 800 hectares (2,000 acres)

Site history
- Built: 1962–1964
- In use: 1964 – present

Airfield information
- Identifiers: IATA: BYJ, ICAO: LPBJ, WMO: 085620
- Elevation: 193.8 metres (636 ft) AMSL
Runways
| Direction | Length and surface |
|---|---|
| 01L/19R | 3,450 metres (11,319 ft) Asphalt |
| 01R/19L | 2,951 metres (9,682 ft) Asphalt |
- Airfield shared with Beja Airport; Source: Portuguese AIP

Beja Air Base (Portuguese: Base Aérea de Beja; IATA: BYJ, ICAO: LPBJ), officially designated as Air Base No. 11 (Portuguese: Base Aérea Nº 11, BA11) is one of the most important military airbases in Portugal, 9 km (5.6 mi) northwest of Beja, 100 km (62 mi) north of Algarve. It is used by the Portuguese Air Force (PoAF) and has two parallel runways in the 01/19 direction, the biggest being 3,450 m × 60 m (11,320 ft × 200 ft). The base is home to two training squadrons, one helicopter squadron and one maritime patrol squadron.

== History ==
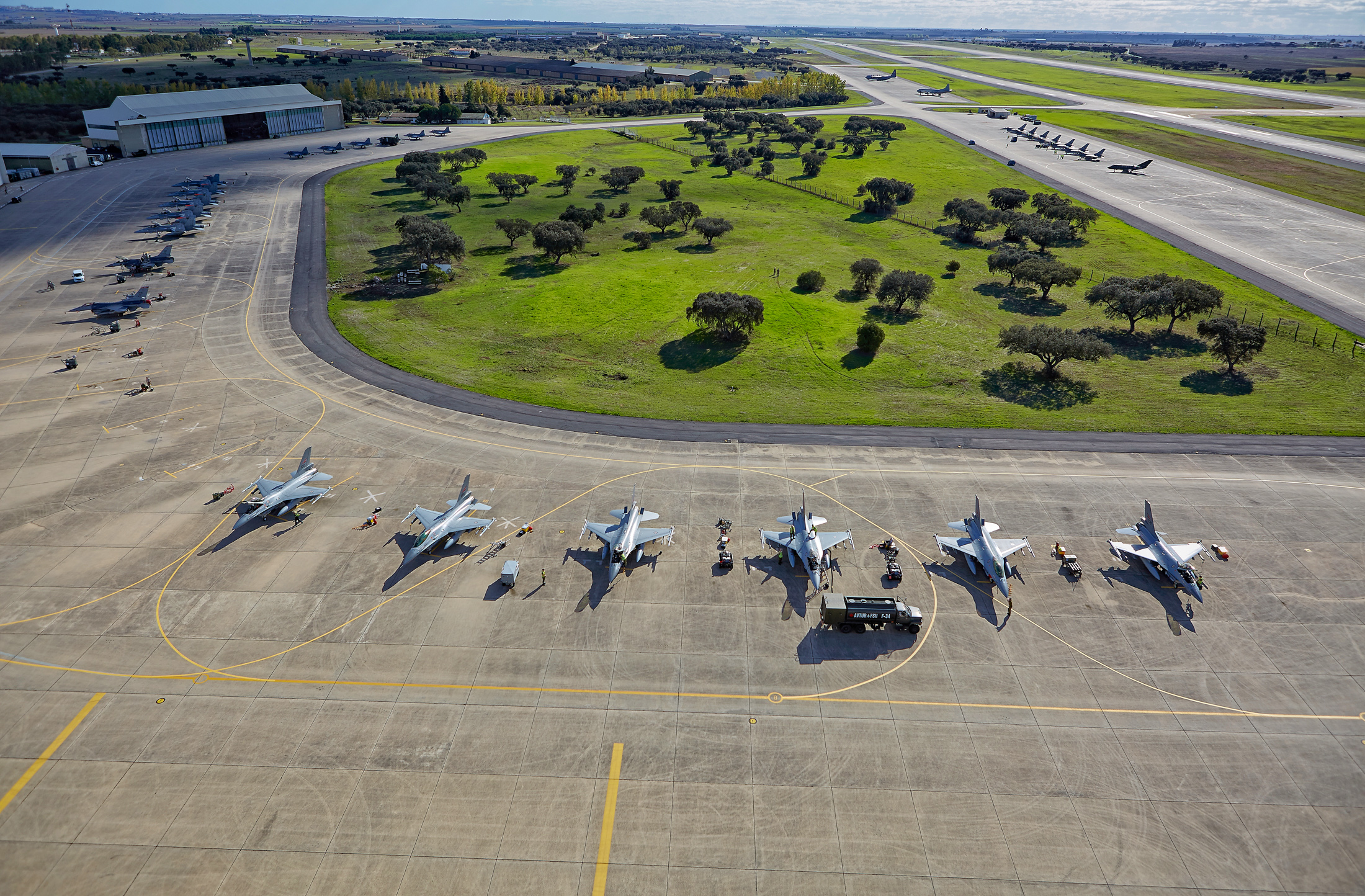
The flight-line at Beja Air Base during Exercise Trident Juncture 2015

The base was established on 21 October 1964, originally built to serve as a training facility for the German Air Force (Luftwaffe), due to airspace limitations within West Germany. The Luftwaffe operated from the airbase until 1993, during which period it was used particularly for weapons training. In 1987 the Portuguese Air Force's 103 Squadron using Lockheed T-33 and Northrop T-38 aircraft was relocated from Montijo. After their arrival, the base started to host a mixed array of fixed and rotary-wing trainers, as well as maritime patrol aircraft.

Between 1993 and 2018, the PoAF has operated Dassault/Dornier Alpha Jet aircraft from the airbase, which were donated by Germany as compensation for leaving the air base in 1993.

== Current state ==
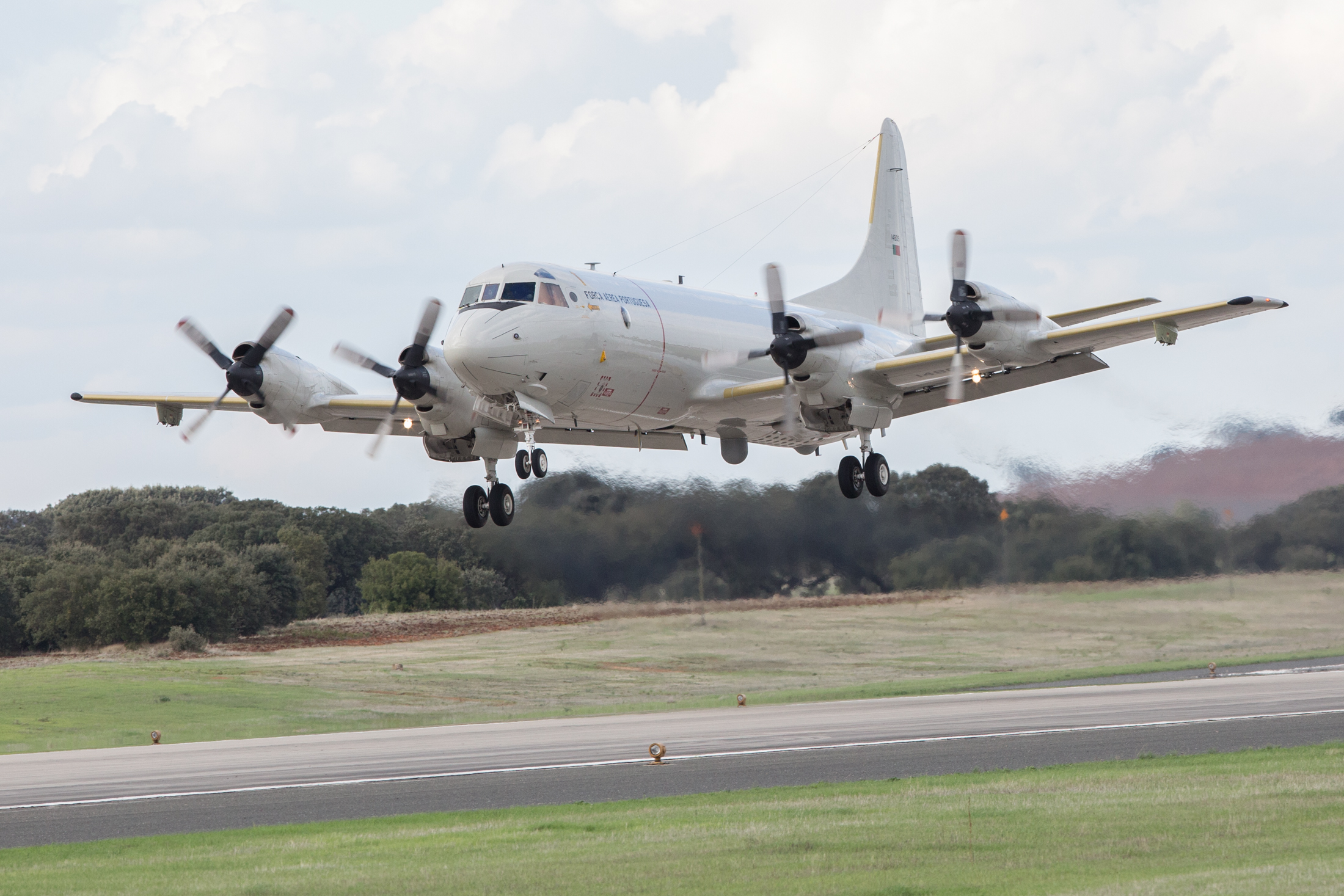
A Portuguese Air Force P-3C Orion maritime patrol aircraft taking-off from Beja Air Base

The base is now modern and well-equipped, employing around 1,000 personnel. It comprises two parallel runways running north–south (01L/19R, 01R/19L, the largest being 3,450 m (11,320 ft) in length and the other 2,951 m (9,682 ft) long. A third parallel runway/taxiway supports its helicopter facilities. Beja Air Base is one of the most important training facilities of the PoAF and during 2008 operated over 70,000 flying hours. The first training phase comprises flying on Socata TB 30 Epsilon aircraft, which currently has 15 operational aircraft. The 552 Squadron operates 5 AgustaWestland AW119 Koala helicopters tasked with tactical transport for the army, helicopter pilot training and search and rescue. The 601 Squadron currently uses 5 P-3C Orion Cup + aircraft which provide 24/7 search and rescue and anti-submarine warfare cover. The 506 Squadron equipped with KC390 aircraft is tasked with tactical air transport operations, air refueling and firefighting.

Construction of a civilian terminal was undertaken in 2009, with this facility being aimed at low-cost carriers.

Beja's runway is the only mainland Portugal runway capable of accommodating an Airbus A380. The Portuguese wet lease airline Hi Fly previously operated its A380, purchased second-hand in 2018, from Beja.

== Tenant units ==
Portuguese Air Force

- 101 Sqn. - TB30 Epsilon
- 103 Sqn. "Caracóis" (Snails) — complementary flying training and operational transition training
- 552 Sqn. "Zangões" (Drones) — tactical air transport operations and complementary flying training in helicopters
- 601 Sqn. "Lobos" (Wolves) — maritime patrol squadron
- 506 Sqn. "Rinocerontes" (Rhinoceros) — tactical air transport operations, air refueling and firefighting
