= Socata TB 30 Epsilon =

French military trainer aircraft

TB 30 Epsilon
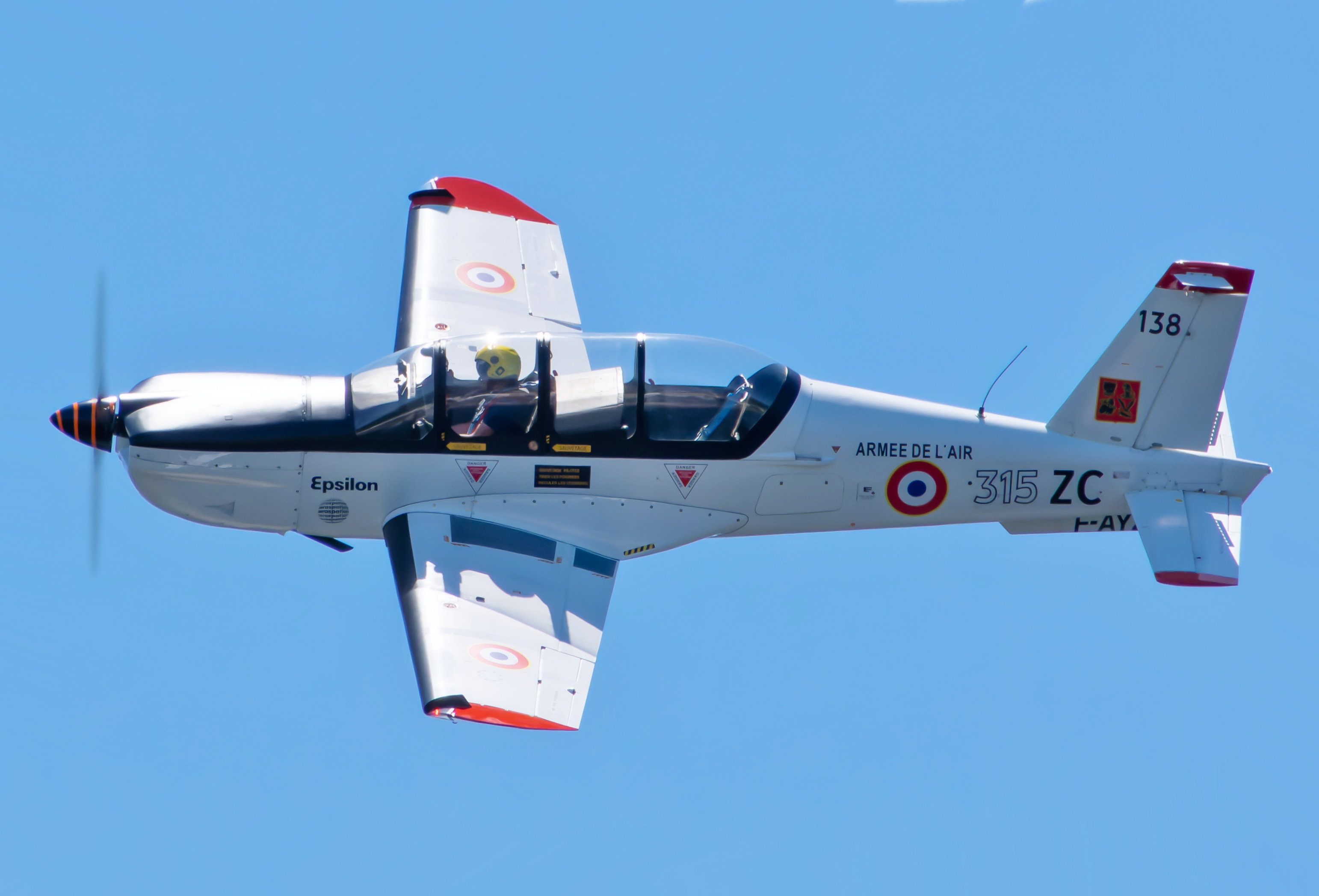
- Socata TB 30 Epsilon

General information
- Type: Light military trainer aircraft
- Manufacturer: SOCATA (Aérospatiale)
- Status: Active service
- Primary users: French Air Force (historical) Portuguese Air Force; Togolese Air Force; Senegalese Air Force

History
- Manufactured: 1979-1989
- Introduction date: 1983
- First flight: 22 December 1979

The Socata TB 30 Epsilon is a light military trainer aircraft produced by SOCATA (then part of Aérospatiale). It is a tandem two-seater with a metal airframe. The first prototype flew on 22 December 1979.

== Design and development ==
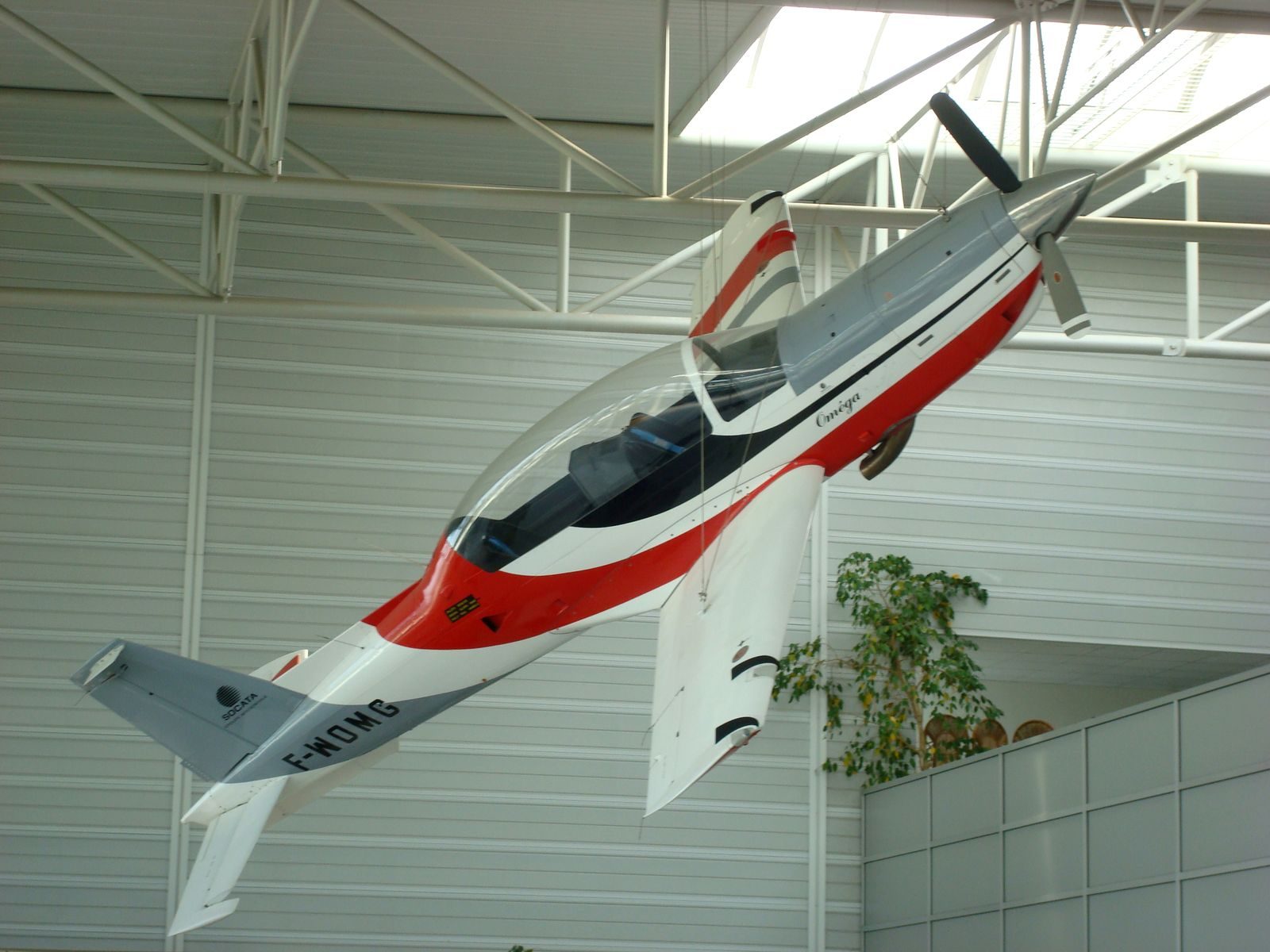
TB 31 Oméga

In 1978, the French Air Force (Armée de l'Air) published a requirement for a new basic trainer aircraft to partially replace the Fouga Magister in the early parts of the syllabus for pilot training. The new aircraft was expected to have tandem seating, be powered by a 224 kW (300 hp) piston engine and have a three-hour endurance. Similar designs were proposed by the SOCATA subsidiary of Aérospatiale (based on their TB 10 Tobago light aircraft) and by GEPAL (the GEPAL Mk II). The SOCATA proposal, the TB 30B, was chosen in February 1979.

The first of two prototypes flew on 22 December 1979, but testing showed that the Epsilon had poor handling and it was redesigned with a new swept back fin supplemented by a ventral strake and a larger tailplane, while the wing was fitted with elliptical tips increasing the wingspan from 7.40 m (24 ft 3 3/8 in) to 7.59 m (24 ft 11 3/4 in). The first prototype flew again with these changes on 31 October 1980, and it was soon found that the handling problems had been fixed.

The Epsilon is a low winged cantilever monoplane of all metal construction. It is powered by a Lycoming O-540 flat-six piston engine driving a two-blade propeller, and is fitted with a retractable nosewheel undercarriage. The pilot and instructor are sat in tandem under a sliding Plexiglas canopy, with cockpit layout designed to aid transition to the Dassault/Dornier Alpha Jet to which French students graduate after completing the Epsilon part of their training syllabus.

The first prototype was modified into a testbed for the Turbomeca TP 319 Arrius turboprop engine, flying in this form on 9 November 1985. The testbed was then modified into a dedicated turboprop trainer, the TB 31 Oméga, powered by a 360 kW (483 shp) Arrius 1A2 and fitted with ejection seats, returning to flight on 30 April 1989. While it was offered for the United States Air Force/United States Navy Joint Primary Aircraft Training System competition to replace the Beechcraft T-34 Mentor and Cessna T-37 Tweet, it was rejected, with no sales resulting.

== Operational history ==
The Armée de l'Air placed an initial order for 30 Epsilons in 1981, with further contracts following with a total of 150 ordered. First deliveries started in 1983, with the first training courses based on the Epsilon starting in September 1984.

Export orders were received from Togo for three armed Epsilons in 1984, delivered in 1986 (with a fourth supplied later to replace a crashed aircraft) and from Portugal in 1987 for 18 aircraft, to be assembled in Portugal by OGMA.

== Variants ==
- TB 30 Epsilon: Military trainer aircraft
- TB 31 Oméga: Proposed turboprop powered version of the TB 30 Epsilon. Only one aircraft built

== Operators ==
=== Current ===
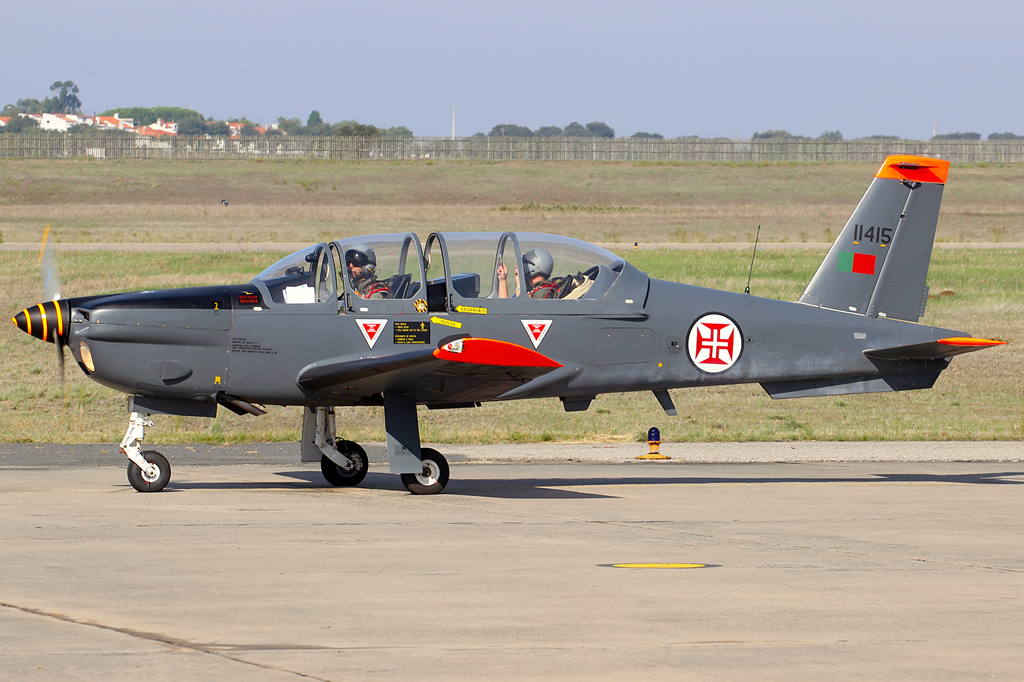
A Portuguese Air Force TB 30

Portugal

- Portuguese Air Force

Senegal

- Senegalese Air Force

Togo

- Togolese Air Force

=== Former operators ===
France

- French Air Force

== Specifications ==
Data from The Encyclopedia of World Aircraft,Jane's All The World's Aircraft 1988-89

General characteristics

- Crew: 2
- Length: 7.59 m (24 ft 11 in)
- Wingspan: 7.92 m (26 ft 0 in)
- Height: 2.66 m (8 ft 9 in)
- Wing area: 9 m^{2} (97 sq ft)
- Aspect ratio: 7
- Airfoil: root: RA 1643 (16%); tip: RA 1243 (12%)
- Empty weight: 932 kg (2,055 lb)
- Max takeoff weight: 1,250 kg (2,756 lb)
- Powerplant: × Lycoming AEIO-540-L1B5D 6-cylinder air-cooled horizontally-opposed piston engine, 220 kW (300 hp)
- Propellers: 2-bladed constant-speed propeller

Performance

- Maximum speed: 378 km/h (235 mph, 204 kn)
- Cruise speed: 358 km/h (222 mph, 193 kn)
- Stall speed: 115 km/h (71 mph, 62 kn)
- Never exceed speed: 520 km/h (320 mph, 280 kn)
- Range: 1,300 km (810 mi, 700 nmi)
- Service ceiling: 7,010 m (23,000 ft)
- Rate of climb: 9.4 m/s (1,850 ft/min)

Armament

- Up to 480 kg (1,100 lbs) on four underwing hardpoints (export versions)

== See also ==
Related development

- Socata TB 10 Tobago

Aircraft of comparable role, configuration, and era

- ENAER T-35 Pillán

Related lists

- List of civil aircraft
