= 401 Squadron (Portugal) =

- Esquadra 401
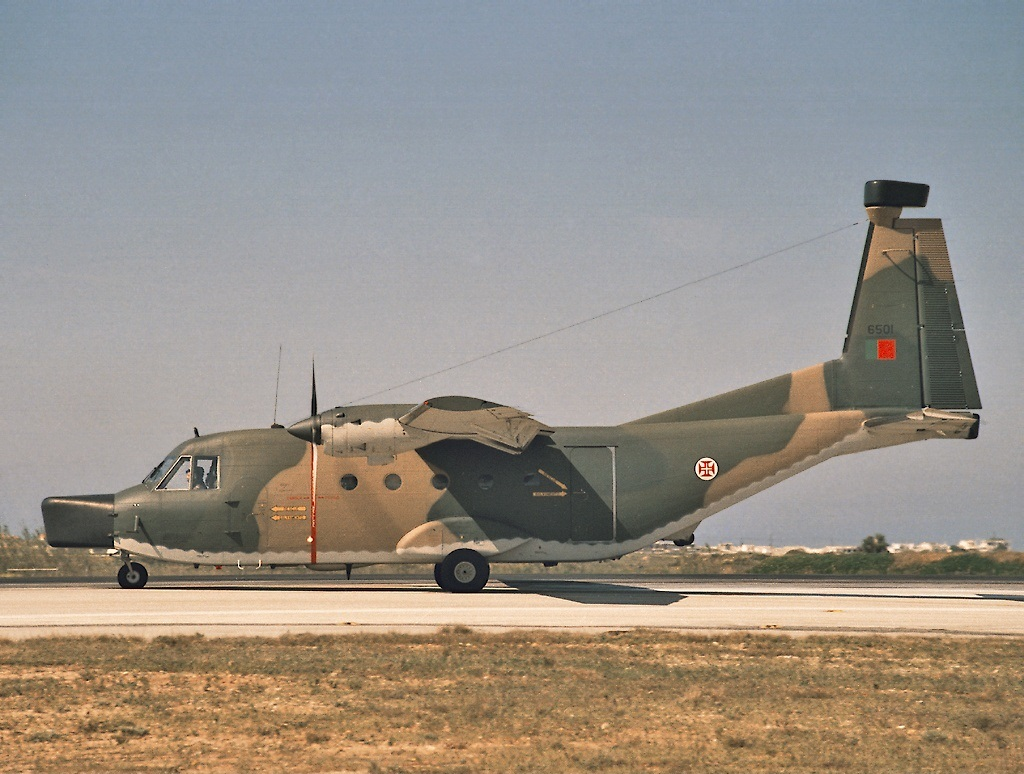
- Former Portuguese Air Force C-212-100ECM
- Active: 1966–2011
- Disbanded: December 6, 2011
- Country: Portugal
- Branch: Portuguese Air Force
- Role: Reconnaissance, maritime patrol
- Garrison/HQ: Air Base No. 6
- Nickname: Cientistas (Scientists)
- Mottos: «...Ciência, Engenho e Arte...» (...Science, ingenuity and art...)

401 Squadron "Cientistas" (Esquadra 401) was an aerial reconnaissance, photography and maritime patrol squadron of the Portuguese Air Force disbanded in 2011. The squadron also conducted counter-narcotic operations, monitoring of marine pollution in the Portuguese exclusive economic zone, and natural resource surveying.

== Roles and missions ==
The primary mission of 401 Squadron was aerial reconnaissance and photography. It had as its secondary missions the support of electronic warfare, maritime patrol, and search and rescue.

The squadron also performed medical evacuations in the archipelagos of Madeira and Azores, and surveillance against narcotic trafficking, illegal fishing, and pollution. Additionally, it provided support to national agencies and institutions by conducting mineral and energy exploration surveys.

== History ==
The origin of 401 Squadron dates back to the creation of the Transport and Liaison Squadron (Portuguese: Esquadra de Ligação e Transporte) in 1966, based at Air Base No. 1 (Portuguese: Base Aérea N º1, BA1), which performed aerial photography tasks. That same year, the squadron used a Wild RC8 vertical metric camera to perform the first aerial survey in Portugal.

In 1975 the squadron started operating the C-212-100 fitted with RC10 cameras and geophysical survey equipment.

In 1979 the squadron's designation and name were changed to Reconnaissance Squadron (Portuguese: Esquadra de Reconhecimento) and later in 1984 the squadron was assigned the maritime patrol mission.

In 1991 the squadron was added to the fishing activity control, inspection and surveillance integrated system's (Portuguese: Sistema Integrado de vigilância, Fiscalização e Controlo das Actividades da Pesca, SIFICAP) command and in 1995 started operational flights with the C-212-300 equipped for maritime patrol and fisheries protection.

Its aircraft's equipment was upgraded in 1993, with the acquisition of Leica Geosystems RC30 cameras and GPS equipment.

The squadron was re-designated as 401 Squadron in 1995, for the last time, and was assigned the search and rescue mission.

In 2008 the squadron was assigned all the missions of 502 Squadron, which was transitioning from the CASA C-212 to the then entering service EADS CASA C-295 aircraft, and in May 2009, was relocated from BA1 to Air Base No. 6 (Portuguese: Base Aérea Nº 6).

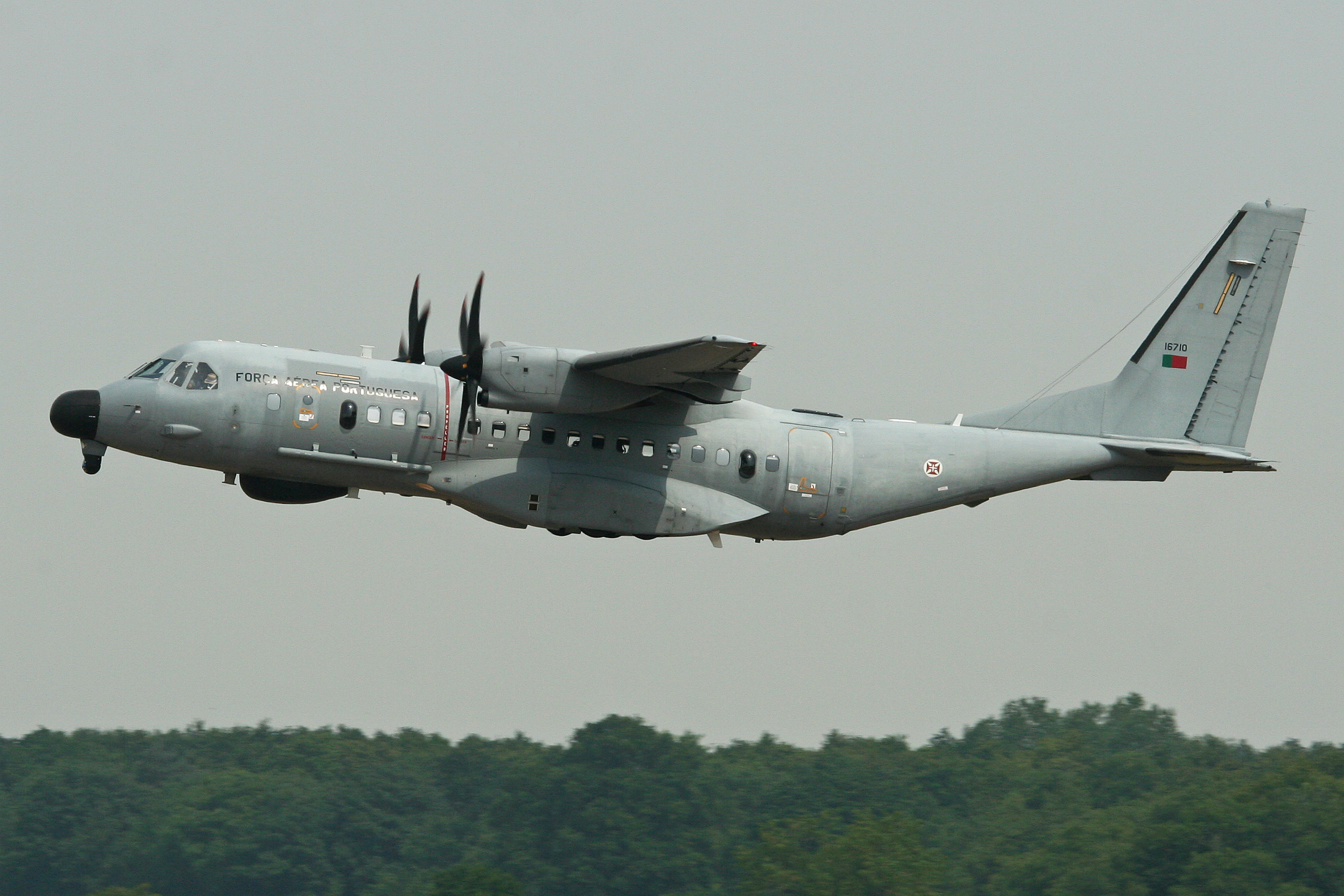
EADS CASA C-295 maritime patrol variant aircraft from 502 Squadron

On December 6, 2011, a ceremony took place at BA6 signaling the disbandment of the squadron. 502 Squadron was then assigned 401 Sqn.'s original aerial reconnaissance, maritime patrol, and fishery protection missions.

=== Lineage ===
- Constituted as Esquadra de Ligação e Transporte (Transport and Liaison Squadron) in 1966
- Re-designated as Esquadra de Ligação e Fotografia (Photography and Liaison Squadron) in 1973
- Re-designated as Esquadra de Reconhecimento e Pesquisa de Recursos (Resource Research and Reconnaissance Squadron) in 1974
- Re-designated as Esquadra de Reconhecimento (Reconnaissance Squadron) in 1979
- Re-designated as Esquadra 401 (401 Squadron) in 1995

Disbanded on December 6, 2011

== Aircraft ==
- Beechcraft Model 18 (1966–1975)
- Douglas C-47 Dakota (1974–1976)
- CASA C-212-100 Aviocar (1975–2011)
- CASA C-212-300 Aviocar (1994–2011)

== See also ==
- Portuguese Air Force
- List of aircraft of the Portuguese Air Force
- 502 Squadron
- 503 Squadron
- 711 Squadron
- Aerial survey
- Imagery intelligence
- Photogrammetry
- Fishing in Portugal
- Prestige oil spill
- Jakob Maersk oil spill

== Bibliography ==
- "Esquadra 401 encerra a actividade operacional" [401 Squadron concludes its operational activity]. Mais Alto (in Portuguese) (395). Lisbon: Portuguese Air Force: 4–6. January–February 2012.
- C-212 Aviocar ao serviço de Portugal desde 1974 [C-212 Aviocar at the service of Portugal since 1974] (in Portuguese) (I ed.). Lisbon: Portuguese Air Force. December 2011. ISBN 978-972-99933-6-7.
