= Airbus C295 =

European tactical military transport aircraft

C295
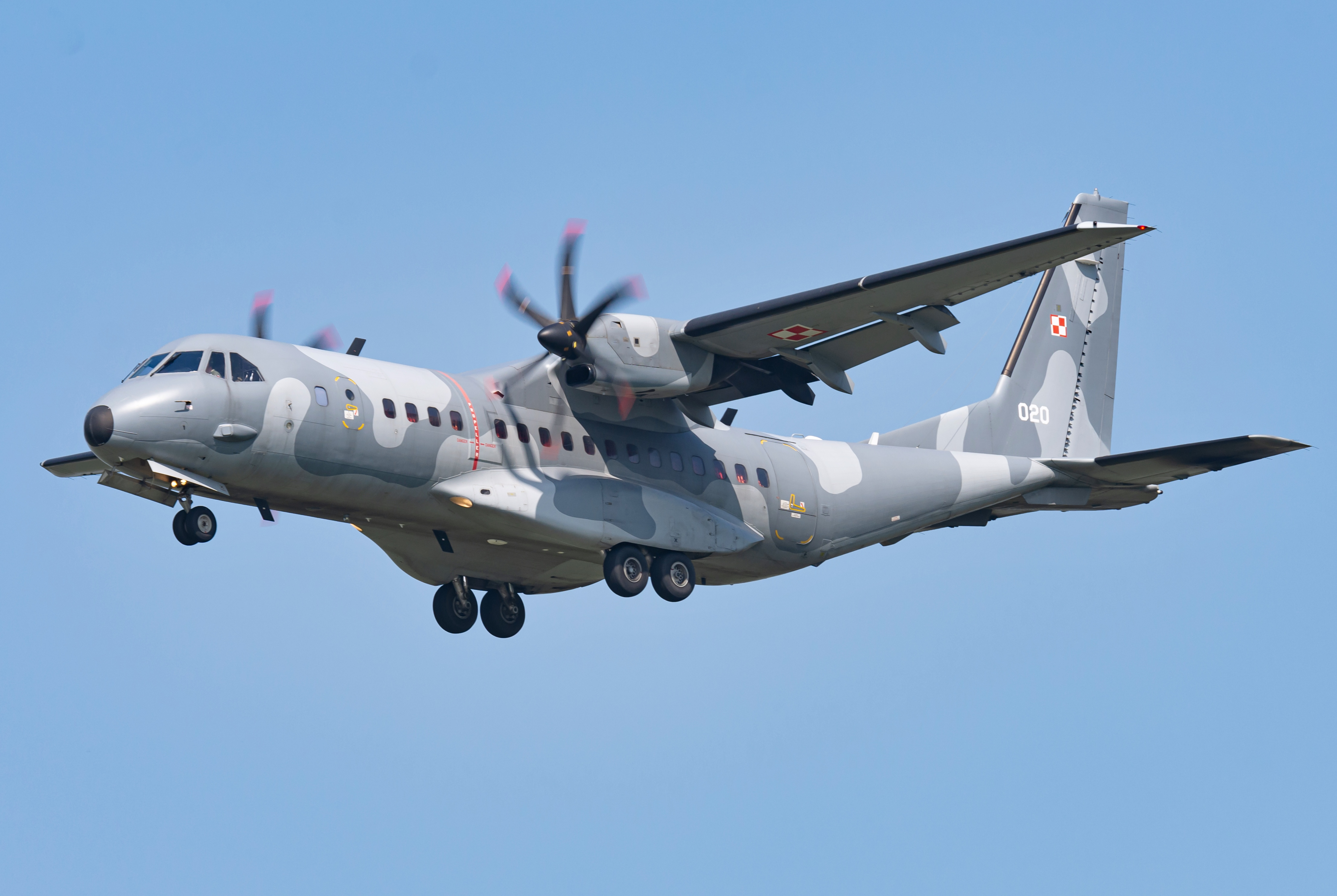
- A Polish Air Force C-295M

General information
- Type: Military transport aircraft
- Manufacturer: CASA; EADS; Airbus Defence and Space; Indonesian Aerospace; Tata Advanced Systems
- Status: In service
- Primary users: Royal Canadian Air Force Irish Air Corps; Polish Air Force; Indian Air Force
- Number built: 241

History
- Manufactured: 1997–present
- Introduction date: 2001
- First flight: 28 November 1997
- Developed from: CASA/IPTN CN-235

The Airbus C295 (previously CASA C-295) is a medium-range twin-engined turboprop tactical transport aircraft that was designed and initially manufactured by the Spanish aerospace company CASA, which is now part of the European multinational Airbus Defence and Space division.

Work on what would become the C-295 was started during the 1990s as a derivative of the successful CASA/IPTN CN-235 transport aircraft. On 28 November 1997, the prototype performed its maiden flight; quantity production commenced shortly thereafter. In April 1999, the Spanish Air Force became its launch customer with an order for nine military-configured C-295s; two years later, the type was declared operational with the service. Further orders for the C-295 would promptly follow. Following the incorporation of CASA into the pan-European aeronautical group EADS in 2000, it was redesignated as the EADS CASA C-295. EADS rebranded itself as Airbus in 2015.

Both manufacturing and final assembly of the C-295 is normally performed at the Airbus Defence and Space facilities in San Pablo Airport, located in Seville, Spain. Additional manufacturing arrangements have been agreed with some customers. Since 2011, Indonesian Aerospace has produced the CN-295 under license at their facilities in Bandung, Indonesia, via an industrial collaboration with Airbus Defence & Space. During 2021, it was agreed that, as a part of a larger purchase, a batch of 40 C-295s for the Indian Air Force would be license-manufactured in India by Tata Advanced Systems, at its facility in Vadodara, Gujarat. As a part of further order for the Indian Navy and the Indian Coast Guard, the facility will also process delivery of 15 more aircraft for maritime patrol roles.

Beyond its use as a tactical transporter, the C-295 is capable of performing a wide variety of missions effectively. These include parachute and cargo dropping, electronic signals intelligence (ELINT), medical evacuation (MEDEVAC), and maritime patrol. Some of the equipment for adapting the aircraft to performing various roles has been mounted onto pallets, allowing for its rapid installation and removal. On account of the lack of sales achieved by the CN-235 in the commercial aviation segment, although civil certification was obtained as to facilitate its use by government agencies, a commercial version of the C-295 was not pursued for some time by the company. It was not until 2017, over a decade after military-oriented C-295s had entered regular service, that the first contract for a civilian C-295 was finalised.

The C-295 has been acquired by multiple nations including Spain, India, Indonesia, Egypt, Poland, Canada, Brazil, Mexico, Philippines, Portugal, Ireland, Bangladesh and others.

== Development ==
=== Initial development ===
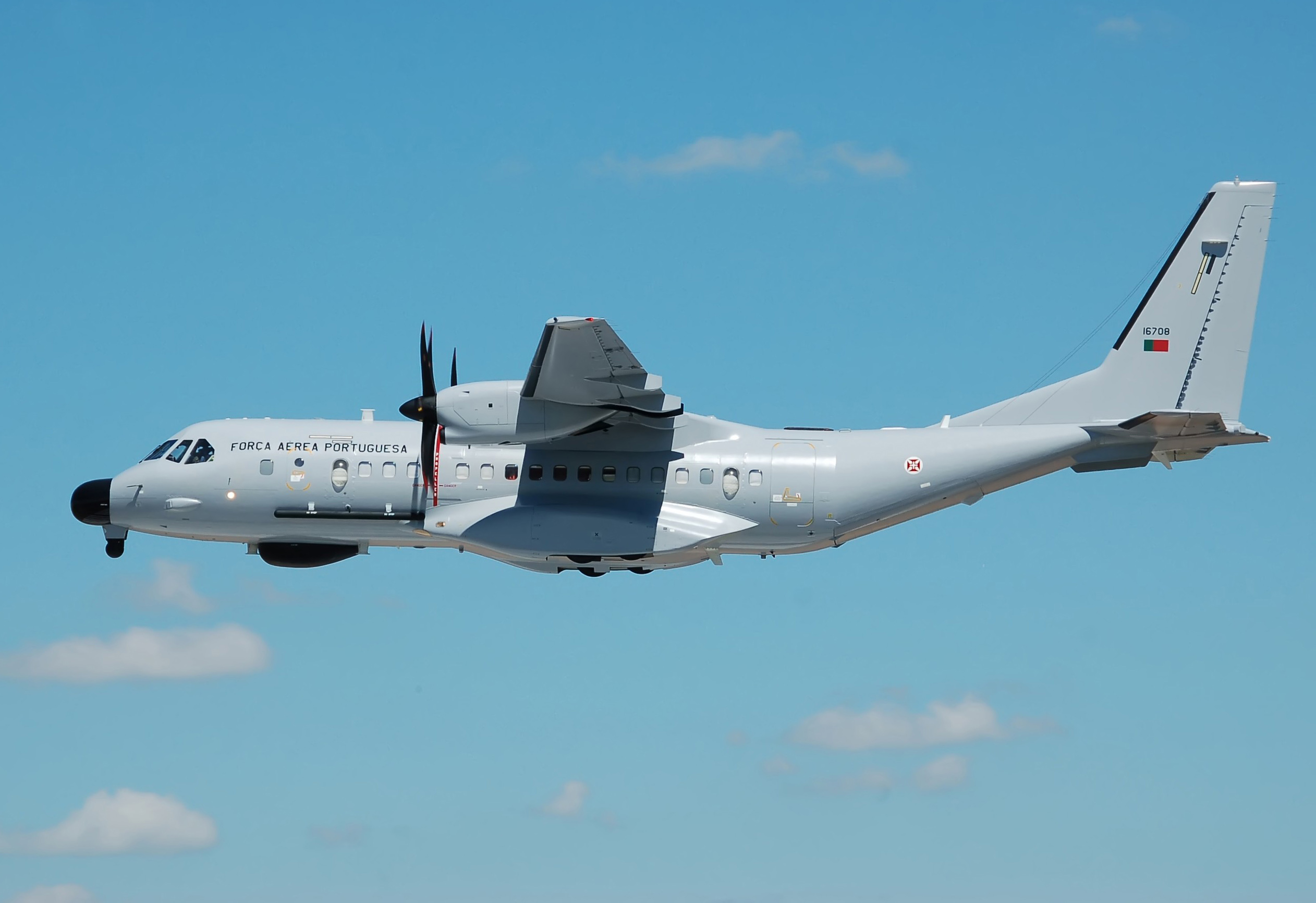
Portuguese Air Force C-295 (code 16708) arrives at RAF Fairford, Gloucestershire, England, on 10 July 2014, for the Royal International Air Tattoo.

During November 1996, the Spanish aerospace company CASA formally started development work on the C-295. It was derived from the CASA/IPTN CN-235, a Spanish–Indonesian transport aircraft; its principal differences were its stretched fuselage, a 50% increase in payload capacity and the adoption of more powerful Pratt & Whitney Canada PW127G turboprop engines. On 28 November 1997, the first prototype made its maiden flight. During April 1999, it was announced that the C-295's first order had been placed by the Spanish Air Force, which sought nine military transport aircraft. During December 1999, it was certificated as airworthy by both the Spanish Dirección General de Aviación Civil and the American Federal Aviation Administration. In November 2001, deliveries began to the Spanish Air Force.

=== Further development ===
During June 2012, Airbus Military announced several enhancements to the base C-295 design, changes included the adoption of winglets and an ability to carry the Marte anti-ship missile; a dedicated airborne early warning and control variant was also planned. In November 2015, a C-295 successfully demonstrated a new self-protection suite, which incorporated elements such as directional infrared countermeasures from Elbit Systems and infrared passive airborne warning system. During January 2016, Airbus was in the process of developing a new probe-and-drogue aerial refuelling rig to be optionally installed in the centerline of the C295, facilitating the aerial refuelling of helicopters. The company was also implementing flap optimisations and other modifications upon the type to enable it to perform extremely short takeoff and landing (STOL) capabilities. In November 2019, it was announced that Airbus had selected Collins Aerospace to integrate its Pro Line Fusion flight deck onto future C-295s, which shall reportedly reduce pilot workload and easily facilitate further upgrades via its modular design.

In January 2022, it was announced that Airbus had flown its C295 Flight Test Bed 2 Sky 2 for the first time; development of this upgraded aircraft was funded by the European Union's Horizon 2020 research program and it is intended to test various technologies related to future regional multi-mission aircraft. Modifications include a high-efficiency semi-morphing wing, dynamic winglets, a flat panel SATCOM antenna integrated into the upper fuselage, along with innovative flight controls for the primary control surfaces to achieve improved aerodynamics and contribute to a more efficient high-lift system. New materials and technologies were used to reduce the emission of CO_{2}, NO_{x}, and noise alike; Airbus aims for 43% CO_{2} and 70% NO_{x} reductions to be achieved in a typical search-and-rescue mission of 400 nautical miles, as well as 45% less noise during takeoff.

== Design ==
The C-295 is a tactical transport aircraft, designed for the movement of personnel and cargo under military conditions. Accordingly, it can be operated from austere airstrips with minimal reliance on ground support infrastructures; it can reportedly be operated on soft ground without major issues even when heavily loaded. It has an auto-reverse capability, being able to turn 180º on runways as narrow as 12 metres wide. The dimensions of its cargo hold are 12.69 × 1.90 × 2.70 metres, roughly three metres longer in comparison to the preceding CN-235. It has sufficient volume to carry up to 71 soldiers, 24 stretchers along with up to seven medical attendants, five standard 2.7 m (108 in) pallets of cargo, or three Land Rover-sized light vehicles. It is suitable for airdropping paratroopers and cargo on an 2.2 m (88 in)wide platform.

The C-295 has also been designed to facilitate multi-role operations and has been produced in a wide range of configurations. Numerous customers have opted to arm their aircraft to perform intelligence surveillance and reconnaissance (ISR) operations, being outfitted with various sensors such as a multi-mission radar unit; it can even be equipped as a gunship and tasked with providing close air support to ground forces. When appropriately furnished, the C-295 can conduct electronic signals intelligence (ELINT), medical evacuation (MEDEVAC), and maritime patrol aircraft (MPA) duties. Palletised equipment, enabling its rapid installation and removal, is available to outfit the aircraft for use as a VIP transport, aerial refuelling tanker, and water bomber.

The cockpit of the C-295 is furnished with dual controls, flown by a pilot and a co-pilot. It is typically equipped with the Highly Integrated Avionics System (HIAS), based on the digital Topdeck suite produced by the French avionics firm Thales. It also features an Integrated Engine Data and Warning System that manages the engine and fuel systems and alerts pilots to detected faults along with other key information. A Honeywell RDR-1400C weather radar is also typically installed to facilitate instrument flight rules (IFR) operations. The avionics have been designed so that the aircraft can also be operated according to civil standards as well as military ones, including FAR-25 requirements.

Typically, the C-295 is powered by a pair of Pratt & Whitney Canada PW127G turboprop engines, each capable of providing up to 1,972 kW (2,645 shp). These feature a modular design that facilitates easy access and reduced maintenance requirements, reportedly enabling up to 10,000 flight hours of uninterrupted operation before requiring servicing. The normal propellers used are six-bladed scimitar-shaped units, having a diameter of 3.89 m (12.8 ft) built from composite materials by Hamilton Standard.

The C-295 is equipped with a retractable undercarriage in a tricycle configuration, designed by Messier-Dowty. Two side fairings on the lower part of the fuselage accommodate the retracted main landing gear, while an alcove almost directly beneath the cockpit houses the forward landing gear. The undercarriage is durable enough to enable operations from semi-prepared runways. It is equipped with oleo–pneumatic shock absorbers, disc brakes capable of differential braking, and an anti-skid system.

== Operational history ==
The first order for the C-295 was for the Spanish Air Force: during 2000, the Future Medium Transport Aircraft II (FATAM II) program was launched, under which a batch of nine C-295s was ordered to take the place of eight CN-235s that had been converted from general transports into maritime patrol and search-and-rescue aircraft, their reassignment having noticeably depleted the service's medium transport fleet.

The first export customer of the C-295 was the Polish Air Force, initially ordering eight aircraft in 2001, with deliveries commencing two years later. The service bought the type to supplement and eventually replace their Cold War-era Antonov An-26 transports. Further C-295s were ordered by Poland, including to two each in both 2006 and 2007. In June 2012, another five aircraft were ordered, all of which were delivered by the end of 2013. Polish C-295s are typically based at Kraków-Balice Air Base. They have participated in overseas activities, including NATO operations, such as humanitarian air efforts in Kosovo in 2020. A single C-295 is routinely deployed as a support aircraft for the Orlik Aerobatic Team, the Polish Air Force's aerial display unit. One aircraft crashed on 23 January 2008.

Another key country for the C-295 has been Indonesia. Indonesian Aerospace (Indonesian: PT Dirgantara Indonesia), which also locally manufactured the CN-235, performs the final assembly of C-295s for customers within Indonesia. The company has been keen to secure a license that would allow it to produce the aircraft for export customers outside of the domestic market, although Airbus has been allegedly reluctant to agree terms for such an extension. In September 2012, the first part of C-295s were delivered to the Indonesian Air Force. Further aircraft has since been delivered to the service to replace the aged Fokker F27 fleet for tactical and logistical transport duties.

During the 2010s, Egypt became the largest operator of the C-295, having a fleet of 21 aircraft as of April 2021. In October 2010, the order of an initial three aircraft for tactical and logistical transport by Egypt was announced. The first delivery was on 24 September 2011. During January 2013, a follow-on order was signed for six more aircraft and a further eight was ordered on 16 July 2014. In early 2021, Egypt signed a five-year performance-based servicing agreement with Airbus regarding its C-295 fleet, which included the provision of material services, on-site support, and on-wing maintenance activities.

A major competitor for export sales of the C-295 has been the C-27J Spartan, manufactured previously by Alenia Aeronautica (2006–2012) and Alenia Aermacchi (2012–2016), and now by Leonardo S.p.A. The C-295 was a major bidder for the US Army–US Air Force Joint Cargo Aircraft (JCA) programme but lost to the L-3 Communications/Alenia team for the C-27J in June 2007. The C-295 was reportedly considered by the US Army to pose a greater risk due to its use of a new operational mode to meet altitude and range requirements. Among other contracts the C-295 lost to the C-27J are the Peruvian Air Force's Antonov An-32 replacement and the Royal Australian Air Force's de Havilland Canada DHC-4 Caribou replacement.

While the vast majority of C-295 sales have been to military operators, it has been certified for civil purposes as well. During August 2018, it was announced that the Irish leasing company Stellwagen Group has leased a single C-295 to DAC Aviation International, it being the first civil operator of the type in Africa. This aircraft has participated in humanitarian operations, such as the delivery of anti-cholera kits, food, water, sanitation, and hygiene goods to Mozambique.

In 2016, after a 12-year purchasing process that involved three different Canadian federal governments, the Royal Canadian Air Force ordered 16 CC-295s as the replacement search and rescue aircraft for its aging fleets of CC-115 Buffalo and older-model C-130H Hercules. The first plane, painted in Canadian SAR livery, was nearly complete and finished testing at the factory in late 2019. The first operational aircraft arrived in Canada in September 2020, and deliveries continued until 2022. The planes operate from Greenwood, Nova Scotia (413 Transport and Rescue Squadron); Trenton, Ontario (424 Transport and Rescue Squadron); Winnipeg, Manitoba (435 Transport and Rescue Squadron); and Comox, British Columbia (442 Transport and Rescue Squadron and 418 Search and Rescue Operational Training Squadron). The aircraft's primary training centre is located at CFB Comox, where Airbus set up the RCAF Search & Rescue Training Facility for the CC-295. Another aircraft, that arrived in January 2020, is a trainer for the maintenance personnel, and is not included in the 16 aircraft ordered. The aircraft were not used operationally until 2025 because of delays caused by issues with the aircraft's equipment and software. The aircraft is scheduled to reach full operational capability by 2029, with some bases the air frame is already in operational service.

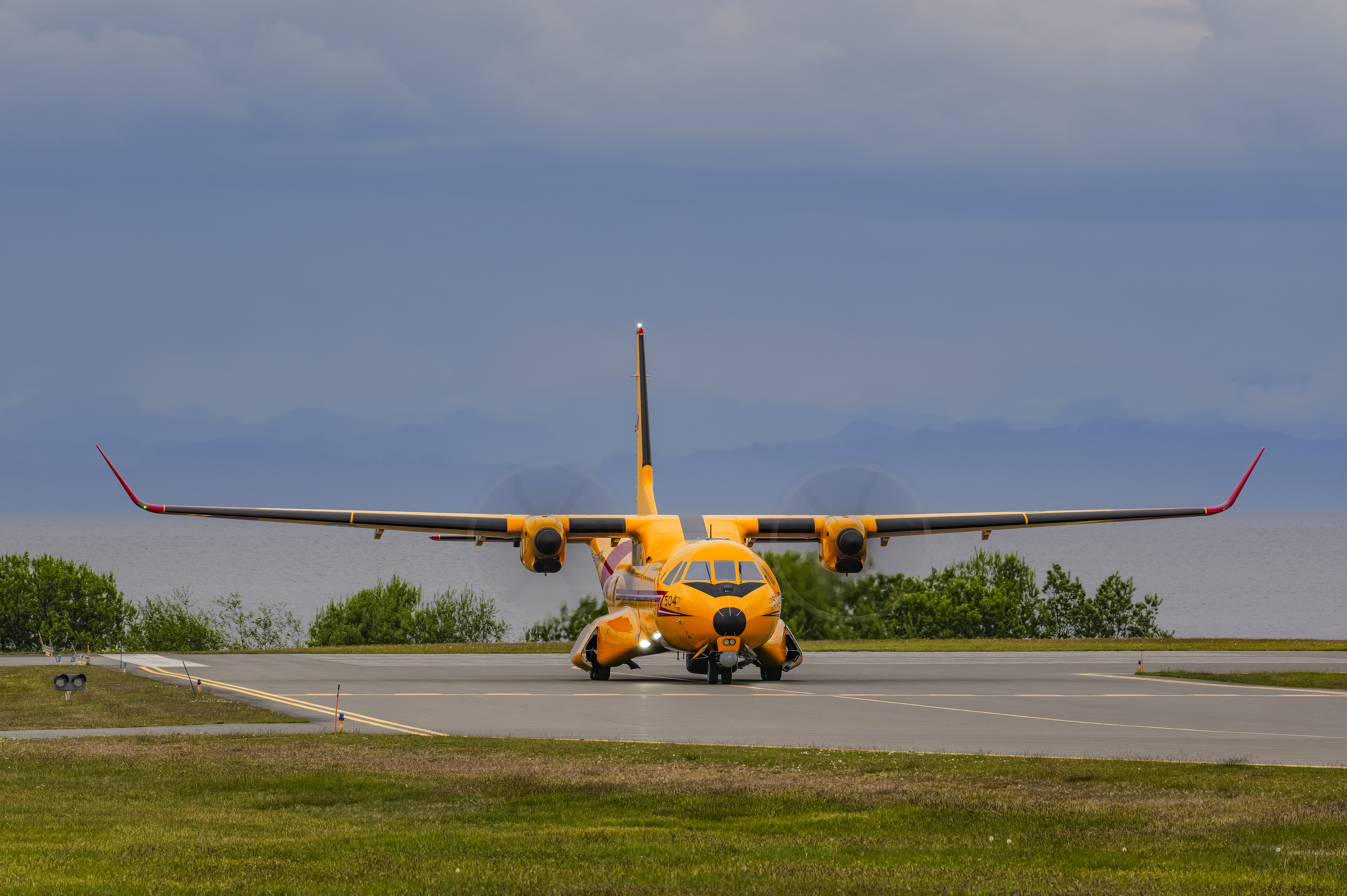
Canadian CC-295 Kingfisher Taxiing at Port Hardy, BC Airport. (YZT)

The C-295 MPA was a candidate to replace the German Navy's P-3C maritime patrol aircraft, possibly as a stopgap solution from 2025 to 2032. During 2021, it was speculated that a combined order with Spain could be achieved. However, during July 2021, Germany announced that it had ordered five P-8 Poseidons to fulfill this need. In June 2023, Spain approved the purchase of 16 C295W, six in the maritime patrol configuration, and ten in the maritime surveillance configuration.

In May 2025, Irish authorities used an Air Corps C295 to extradite senior Kinahan Cartel "lieutenant" Sean McGovern from the United Arab Emirates to be charged with the murder of Noel Kirwan. The aircraft, which flew out of Casement Aerodrome, stopped to refuel in Marseille and Larnaca on both legs of the journey.

=== India ===
==== Air Force variant ====
On 23 July 2012, the Defence Acquisition Council approved the Acceptance of Necessity (AoN) for the purchase of 56 transport aircraft to replace the ageing HS-748 Avro fleet of the Indian Air Force (IAF). On 8 May 2013, the Indian Ministry of Defence had issued a Request for Proposals (RFP) or a global tender to several original equipment manufacturers (OEMs), including Boeing, Lockheed Martin, Airbus Defence & Space, Antonov, Saab, Ilyushin and Alenia Aermacchi. These OEMs were required to partner with an Indian Production Agency (IPA) to first deliver 16 off-the-shelf build and then manufacture 40 aircraft in the country within eight years of signing the contract. Reported competitors to the C-295 included Saab 2000 (entire 56 units would be manufactured in India; not permitted by MoD), Ilyushin Il-214, Antonov An-132 (partnered with L&T). However, after the submission deadline crossed on 22 October 2014, the Tata–Airbus consortium was the only responder for the tender. In February 2015, an independent panel was set up by the MoD to evaluate the sole bidder situation for the tender; the contract was worth around ₹10,000 crore (equivalent to ₹160 billion or US$1.8 billion in 2026).

On 8 September 2021, the Cabinet Committee on Security cleared the procurement of 56 C-295Ws for the IAF. Of these, 16 aircraft would be delivered in flyaway condition from Spain within 48 months of the contract's signing (by August 2025), while 40 more aircraft are to be manufactured in India by Tata Advanced Systems Limited within the following ten years at a "Final Assembly Line" (FAL) in Vadodara, Gujarat. All aircraft from the Tata Aircraft Complex are scheduled to be delivered between September 2026 and August 2031. Also, as per the contract, a D-level Maintenance, Repair and Overhaul (MRO) facility will be set up in India before the completion of deliveries.

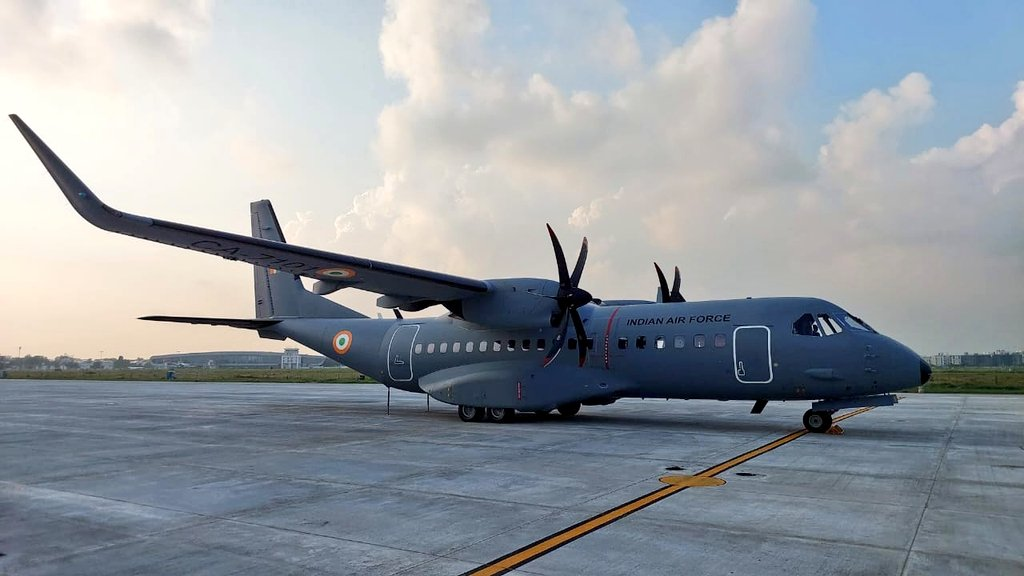
Indian Air Force's first C-295 at its home base in Vadodara

On 24 September 2021, the Ministry of Defence signed a contract worth ₹21,935 crore (equivalent to ₹360 billion or US$3.9 billion in 2026) with Airbus Defence & Space to supply 56 C-295s. The fleet will boost the IAF's tactical airlift capability with the rear ramp for quick reaction and para dropping of troops & cargo and operations from semi-prepared strips, especially in the Northern and North-Eastern sector and the Andaman & Nicobar Islands. The first C-295 was delivered to the IAF on 13 September 2023. Between mid-2024 and August 2025, Spanish-built aircraft were delivered at a rate of roughly one per month until August 2025, followed by deliveries from the domestic plant in Vadodara.

On 30 January 2025, a C-295 was inducted into a flying squadron of the Agra Air Force Station under the aegis of the Central Air Command. The ceremony, attended by high-ranking civilian and military dignitaries, featured a flypast of the transport aircraft flanked by two Su-30MKI and a water-cannon salute while the C-295 taxied into its squadron premises. The squadron will "enhance the training of para commandos and special forces, enabling them to deployed in realistic scenarios to address any threats from across the borders or respond to contingencies that requires swift and reliable domestic response". The rest of the fleet is to be inducted at the rate of 12 units per year. Reportedly, India is planning to place an order for 10 more C-295s. The last Spanish-origin C-295 was received by an Indian envoy in Spain's Seville on 2 August 2025, two months ahead of schedule.

On 30 October 2022, the Indian Prime Minister, Narendra Modi laid the foundation for the Vadodara final assembly line. Ten other nations have the capability to manufacture military transport aircraft. On 28 October 2024, the facility was inaugurated by Indian Prime Minister, Narendra Modi, and Spanish Prime Minister, Pedro Sanchez. The facility will initially deliver eight aircraft per year and the deliveries will complete by 2031.

As part of the agreement, 96% of the assembly job required in Spain's facility will be shifted to the Vadodara facility. Further, 13,400 parts, 4,600 sub assemblies and all significant component assemblies will be manufactured by Indian MSMEs across seven states by the end of production. The localisation of the components will be done at a rate of 4,000 per year. There will be a technology transfer of up to 90% while the whole aircraft will be built in India from the 30th unit onwards in terms of man hours. Only some non-Airbus components like landing gear, engine, and avionics are not being localised. The local content for the initial 16 aircraft from Tata will be 48% and will rise to 75% for the last 24 C-295s. All aircraft feature an Indian electronic warfare suite manufactured by Bharat Dynamics Limited and Bharat Electronics Limited. A full-mission simulator has been established at Agra AFS for training personnel.

In January 2026, the first aircraft from the Indian assembly line was expected to roll out before the September timeline. On 4 February, Wouter van Wersch, Airbus executive vice-president international, also confirmed at the Singapore Airshow that the aircraft's delivery in the second half of the year. The Indian Prime Minister will reportedly officiate the roll out of the aircraft. As per 12 may reports, the first Tata-built C-295 entered the final stages of manufacturing before rollout, which can be conducted ahead of schedule. The Deputy Chief of the Air Staff, Air Marshal A. K. Bharti, visited the facility as the first aircraft was being prepared for maiden flight. The maiden flight was conducted on 10 June.

==== Maritime reconnaissance variant ====
On 16 February 2024, the Defence Acquisition Council approved a proposal to procure nine Medium-Range Maritime Reconnaissance Aircraft (MRMRA) for the Indian Navy and six Multi-Mission Maritime Aircraft (MMMA) for the Indian Coast Guard based on C-295MW transport aircraft. The project is worth around ₹29,000 crore (equivalent to ₹310 billion or US$3.3 billion in 2026). They are to be made in India by the Tata-Airbus tie-up in order to complement the existing fleet of Boeing P-8I Neptune and HAL 228. The MPAs for the Navy and the Coast Guard is being developed by Defence Research and Development Organisation. Of these 15 aircraft, three will be delivered in fly-away condition from Spain for urgent developmental purposes, while the remaining 12 will be delivered by the TASL plant. TASL plans to have 78% indigenous content for the 12 MPA aircraft. The weapon systems of the variants will include NASM-SR, NASM-MR and Torpedo Advanced Light Shyena as well as air-launched sonobuoys.

In March 2025, the Ministry of Defence issued a tender or a Request for Proposal (RfP) for the procurement of MRMRA/MMMA aircraft for the Navy and the Coast Guard. The deadline to submit the commercial bid is December.

== Variants ==
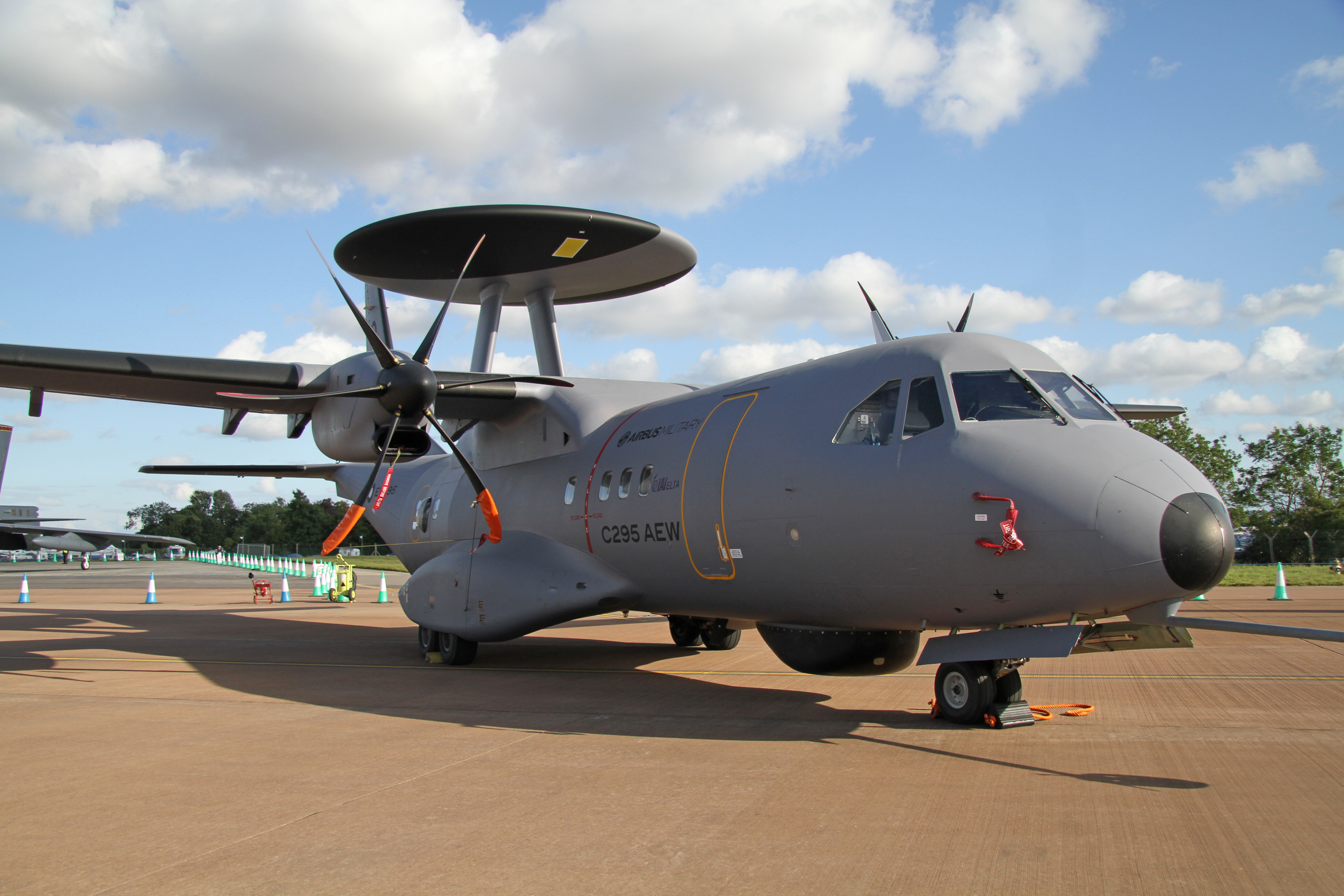
C-295 AEW prototype at the Royal International Air Tattoo in 2011

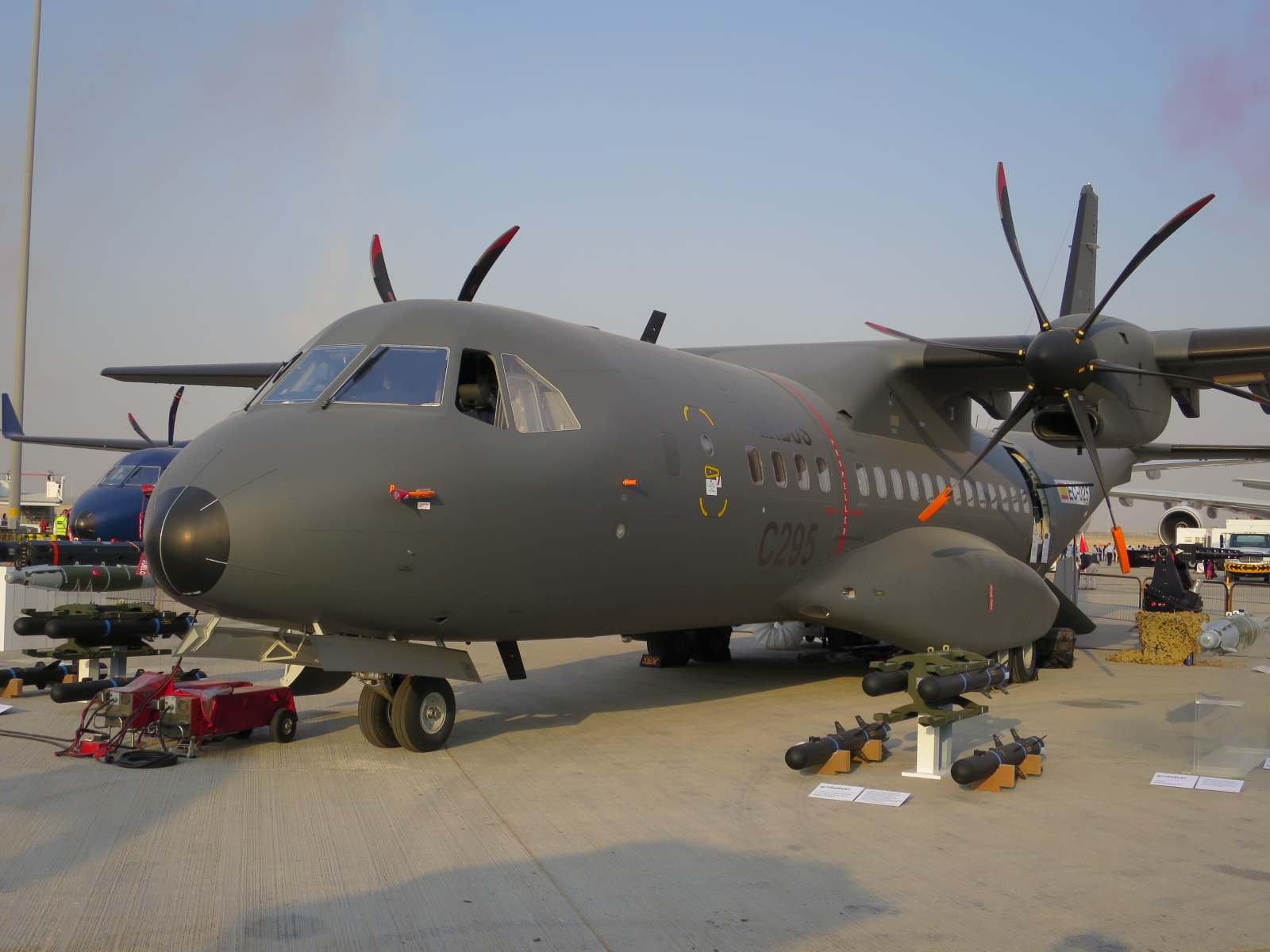
C-295 Armed ISR variant at Dubai Air Show 2017

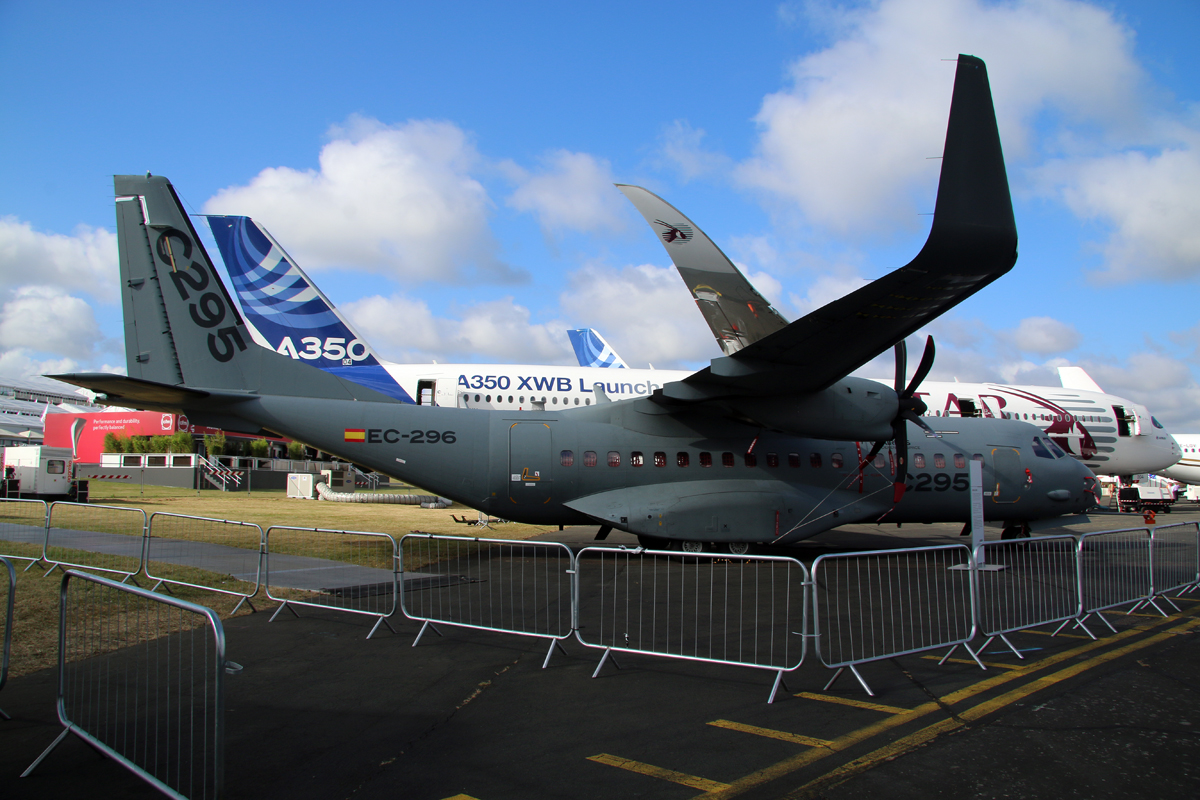
C-295W prototype at the Farnborough Airshow in 2014

C-295M
Military transport version. Capacity for 71 troops, 48 paratroops, 27 stretchers, five 2.24 × 2.74 m (88 × 108 inches) pallets, or three light vehicles.
CN-295
Locally-produced variant by Indonesian Aerospace under license in Bandung, Indonesia.
C-295 MPA/Persuader
Maritime patrol/anti-submarine warfare version. Provision for six hardpoints.
CN-295 MSA
Maritime Surveillance Aircraft. Maritime and overland surveillance, as well as search and rescue missions, support of special operations missions, MEDEVAC capabilities in hostile areas, and for maritime pollution control
C-295 AEW&C
Prototype airborne early warning and control version with EL/W-2090 360 degree radar dome. The AESA radar was developed by Israel Aerospace Industries (IAI) and has an integrated IFF (Identification friend or foe) system.
C-295 Firefighter
Dedicated aerial firefighting aircraft.
CC-295 Kingfisher
Dedicated search and rescue aircraft for the Royal Canadian Air Force based on C-295W.
C-295 SIGINT
Dedicated signals intelligence version.
C-295W
Upgraded model, equipped with wingtip devices (winglets) to improve performance in the takeoff, climb, and cruise phases of flight by increasing the lift-drag ratio.
C-295 ISR
Armed variant equipped with machine guns, small-caliber automatic cannons, rocket launchers, laser-guided bombs, and anti-tank missiles.
AC-295 Gunship
Gunship version developed by Airbus Defence and Space, Orbital ATK, and the King Abdullah II Design and Development Bureau, based on the AC-235 Light Gunship configuration.
KC-295
Dedicated tanker aircraft.

== Operators ==
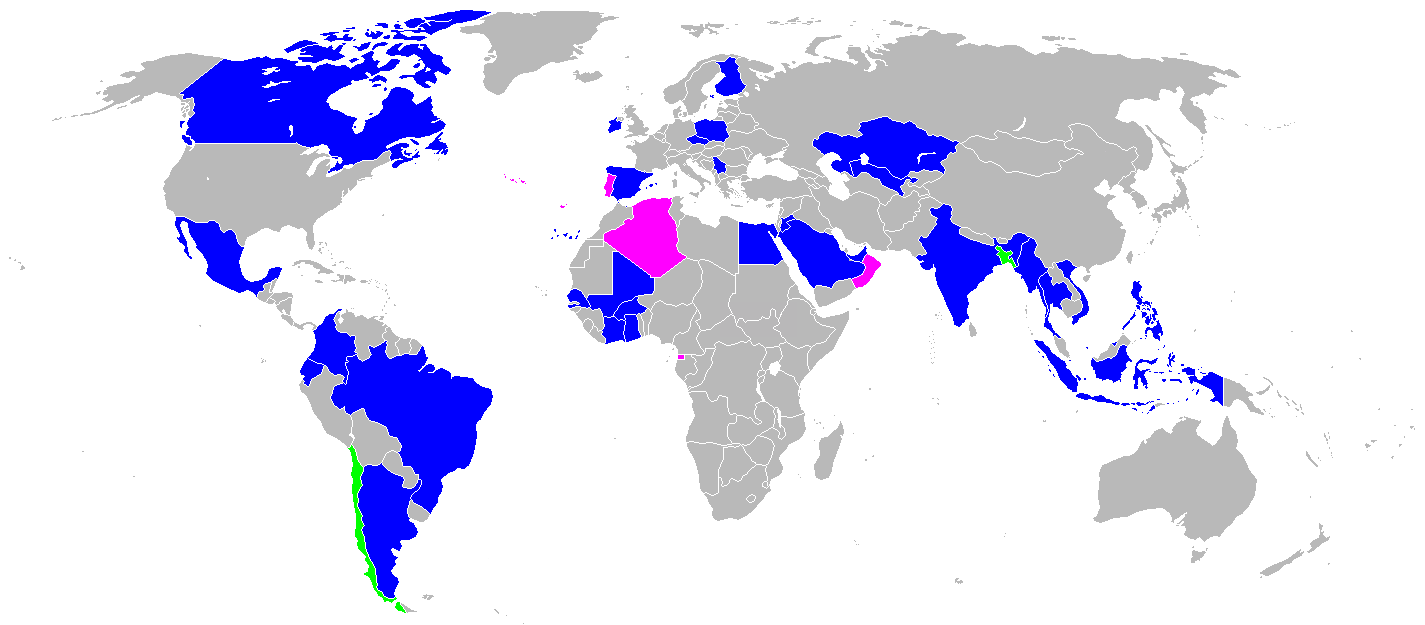
C-295 operators: C-295M users C-295 Persuader users Users of both versions

The C295 is in service with the armed forces of 38 countries. By 30 November 2025, 329 C-295s had been ordered with 238 in service and three lost in accidents.

Algeria

- The Algerian Air Force received six C-295s for transport and maritime patrol. One was lost in an accident. In January 2025, the Spanish government authorized Airbus to export eight new C-295s to Algeria.

Angola

- The Angolan Air Force ordered two C-295s for maritime patrol duties and one for transport.

Bangladesh

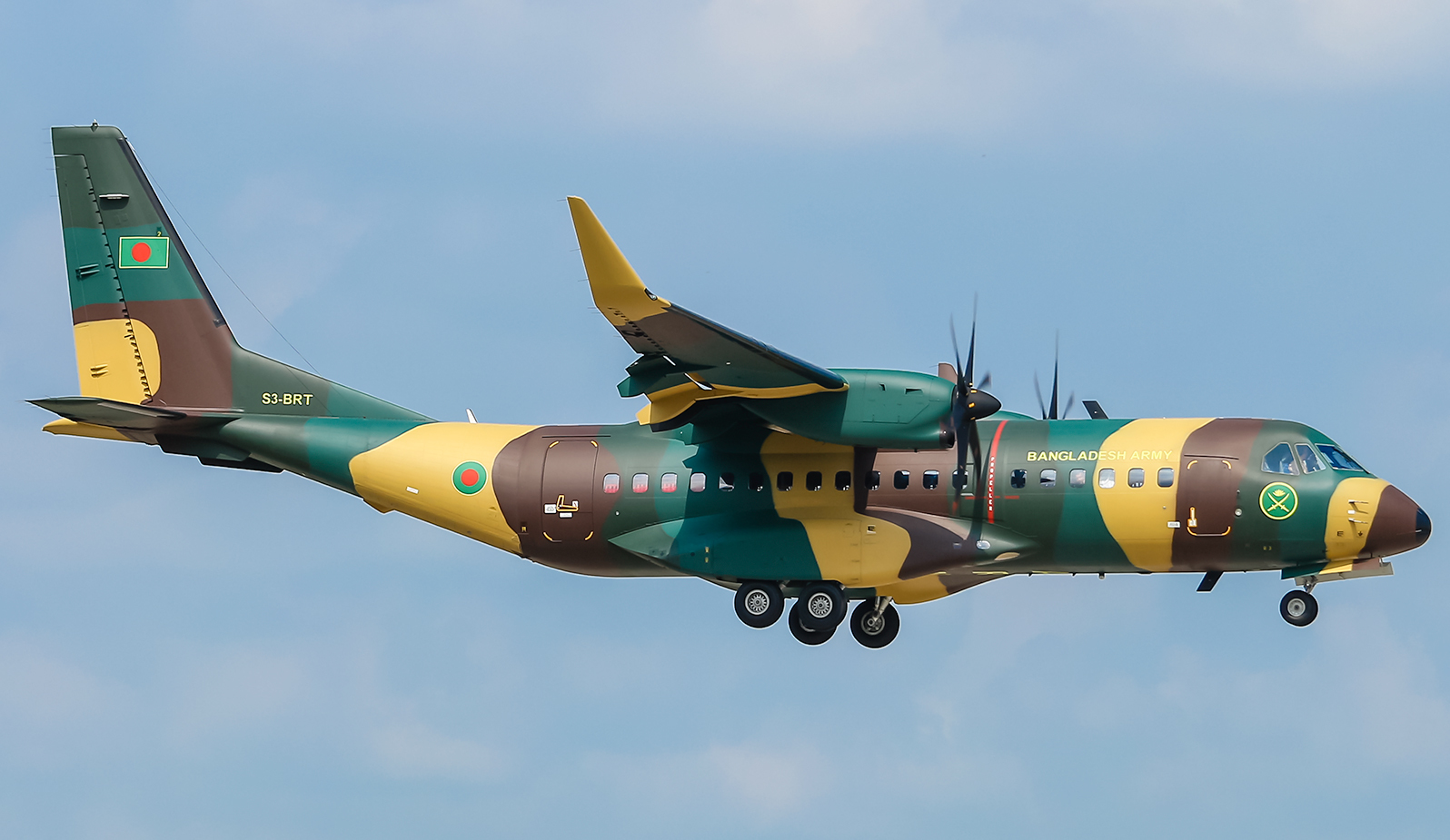
Bangladesh Army Aviation Group CN-295W

- The Bangladesh Army Aviation Group operates two C-295W for tactical transport.

Brazil

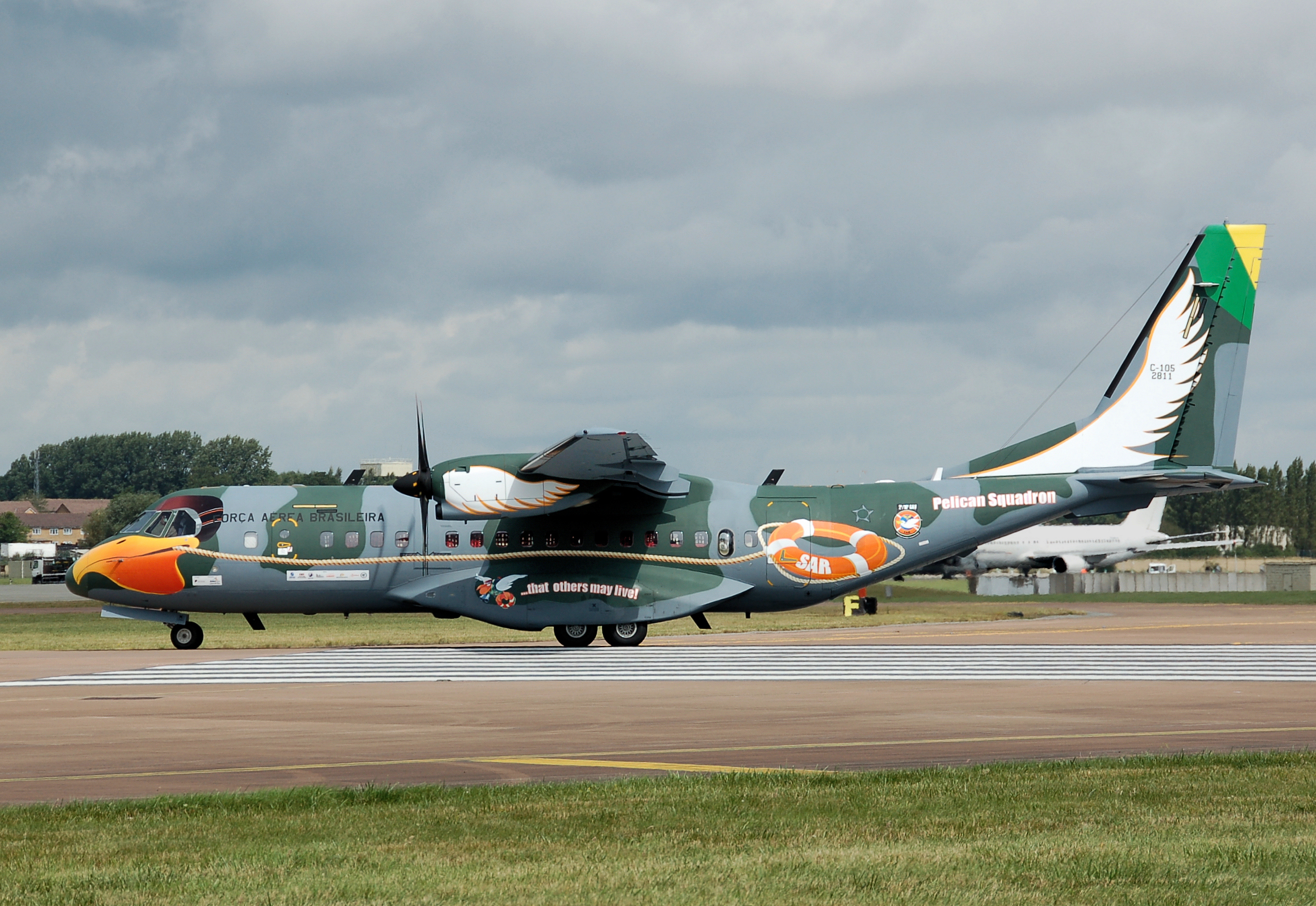
C-295 of the Brazilian Air Force in special markings for RIAT 2009

- The Brazilian Air Force received 13 C-295s, designated C-105A Amazonas, to replace their ageing DHC-5/C-115 Buffalo transports. Additional orders are to raise the total to 15 by 2020.

Brunei

- The Royal Brunei Air Force is to become the 39th operator of the C-295 aircraft worldwide and the eighth in the Asia-Pacific region. A total of four aircraft have been ordered and the first two will be delivered in January 2024.

Burkina Faso

- The Burkina Faso Air Force has taken delivery of one C-295, registration XT-MBH, as of 16 November 2021.

Canada

- The Royal Canadian Air Force ordered 16 CC-295s in 2016 to replace its ageing fleet of CC-115 Buffalos and older-model C-130H Hercules search and rescue aircraft. All aircraft were expected to be delivered by the end of 2022. Additional trainer aircraft for maintenance personnel arrived in 2020 without SAR equipment. The aircraft entered operational service on May 1, 2025. 8 CC-295 as of May 2025

Chile

- The Chilean Navy operates three C-295 MPAs.

Colombia

- The Colombian Air Force operates six C-295s; the last of the original four was delivered in April 2009. The fifth aircraft was ordered in September 2012 and delivered 14 March 2013. The sixth aircraft was ordered in January 2013, entering service before 31 August 2015.

Czech Republic

- The Czech Air Force ordered four C-295 to replace their fleet of Antonov An-26s, all having been delivered in 2010. They are based at Kbely Air Force Base. Their acquisition was undertaken without a tendering procedure as was required by the EU's rules on government procurement, leading the European Commission to challenge the lawfulness of the Czech government's acquisition process. Two more were ordered in 2017.

Ecuador

- The Ecuadorian Air Force operates three aircraft.

Egypt

- The Egyptian Air Force operates 24 C-295s as of August 2018. 533 Air Wing: 2 Sqn and 8 Sqn – Cairo East

Equatorial Guinea

- Equatorial Guinea Air Force – Two (one transport and one surveillance) aircraft on order for delivery from September 2016.

Finland

- The Finnish Air Force operates three C-295s. There is an option for four more additional aircraft.

Ghana

- The Ghanaian Air Force operates three C-295s.

India

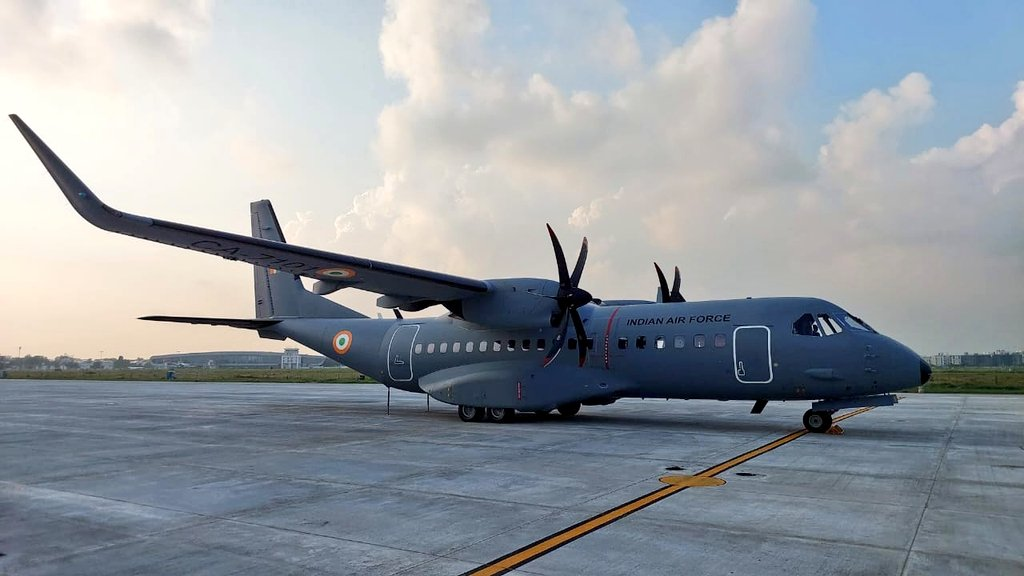
C-295 of Indian Air Force

- Indian Air Force – 16 delivered, out of total 56 C-295MW ordered. While 16 were manufactured by Airbus in Spain the rest of 40 would be built by Tata Advanced Systems in India, with the first Indian-assembled C-295 expected to roll out by or before September 2026. 50 more planned as replacement for older An-32s.
  - Vadodara AFS
    - No. 11 Squadron (Charging Rhinos)
  - Agra AFS
- Indian Navy – Nine planned; proposal has been cleared by Indian Ministry of Defence.
- Indian Coast Guard – Six planned; proposal has been cleared by Indian Ministry of Defence.

Indonesia

- The Indonesian Air Force operates 10 C-295s for tactical and logistical transport. One of them are of the maritime patrol variant, having replace its elderly Fokker F27 Friendships.
- The Indonesian National Police operates one CN-295 for personnel and logistical transport.

Ireland

- The Irish Air Corps ordered two C-295 Maritime Surveillance Aircraft in December 2019 to replace their CN-235 aircraft. On 27 June 2023, the Irish Air Corps took delivery of their first C-295 aircraft. In December 2022, a contract was signed for a third C-295 Military Transport Aircraft variant which arrived in October 2025. As of October 2025, Ireland has 3 C-295 in its inventory, 2 maritime patrol and 1 transport variant, and none on order.

Ivory Coast

- The Air Force of Ivory Coast ordered one C-295 on 21 January 2019.

Jordan

- The Royal Jordanian Air Force operates two C-295s.

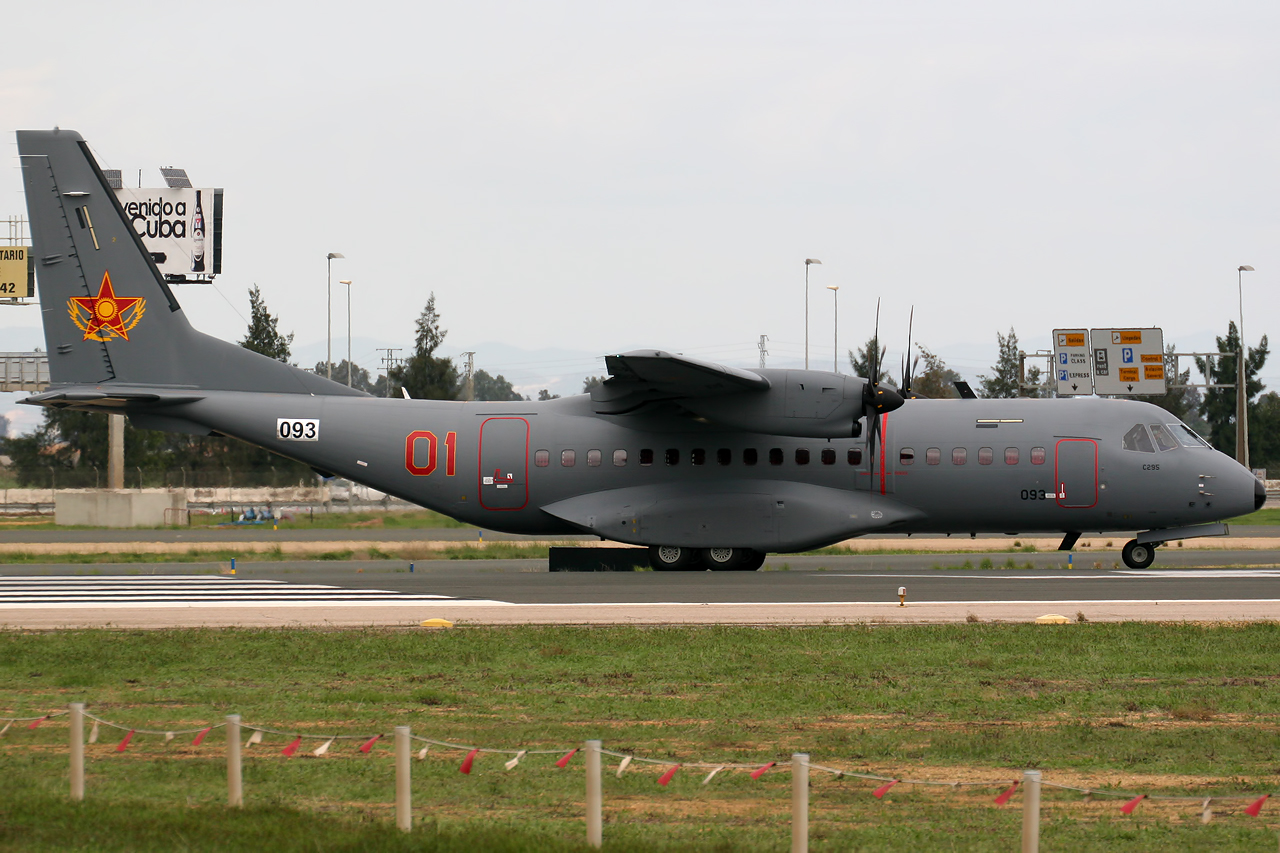
C-295 of the Kazakh Air Defense Forces delivered in 2013

Kazakhstan

- The Kazakh Air Defense Forces operates eight C-295s. In March 2019, Kazakhstan awarded Airbus a contract to produce a ninth C-295 for the Kazakh Air Force.

Mali

- Air Force of Mali – one C-295W ordered in February 2016, delivered in December 2016.

Mexico

- The Mexican Air Force operates eight C-295Ms. They operate in the 301st Squadron, based in Santa Lucia Air Force Base.
- The Mexican Navy operates four C-295Ms and two C-295Ws. They are based at the Tapachula Air Naval Base.

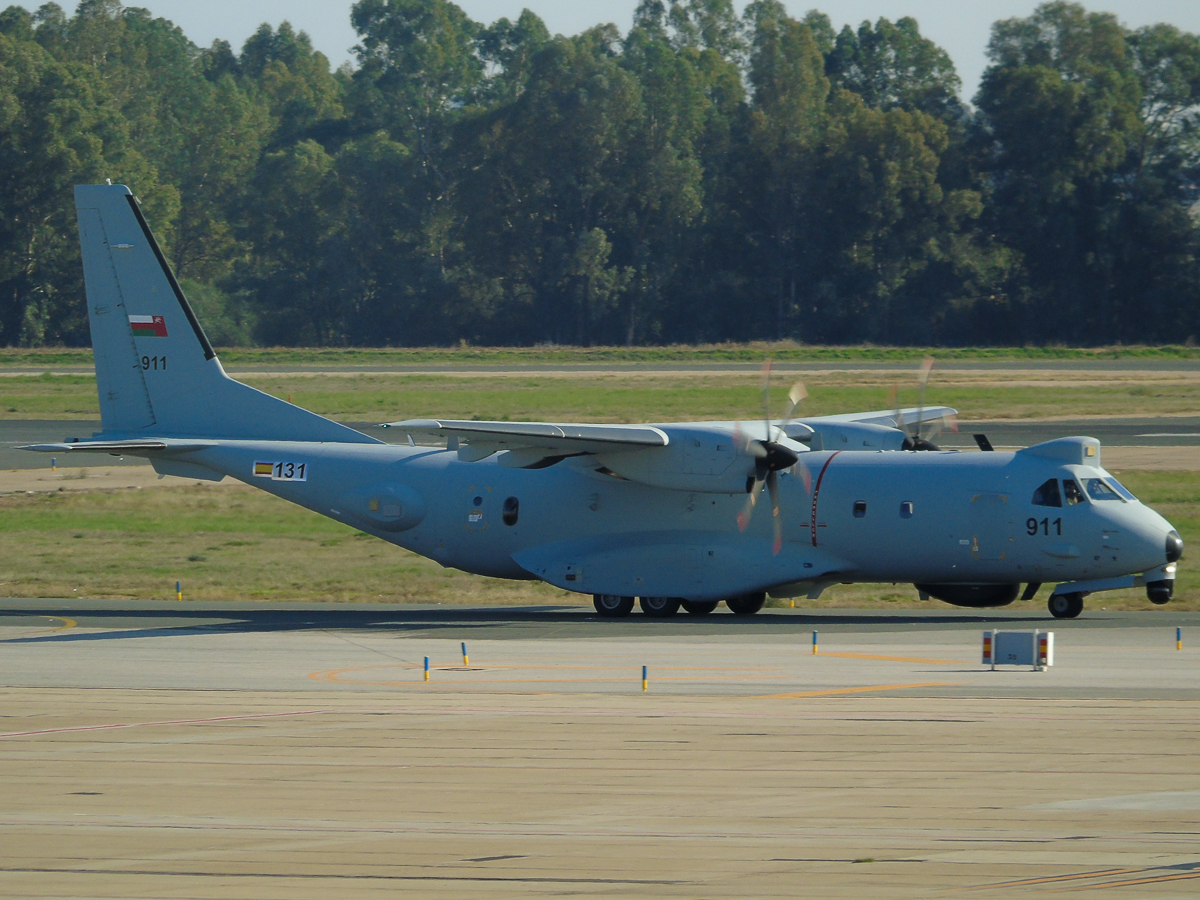
A Royal Air Force of Oman C-295MPA being tested at Seville Airport in 2015

Oman

- The Royal Air Force of Oman operates eight C-295s.

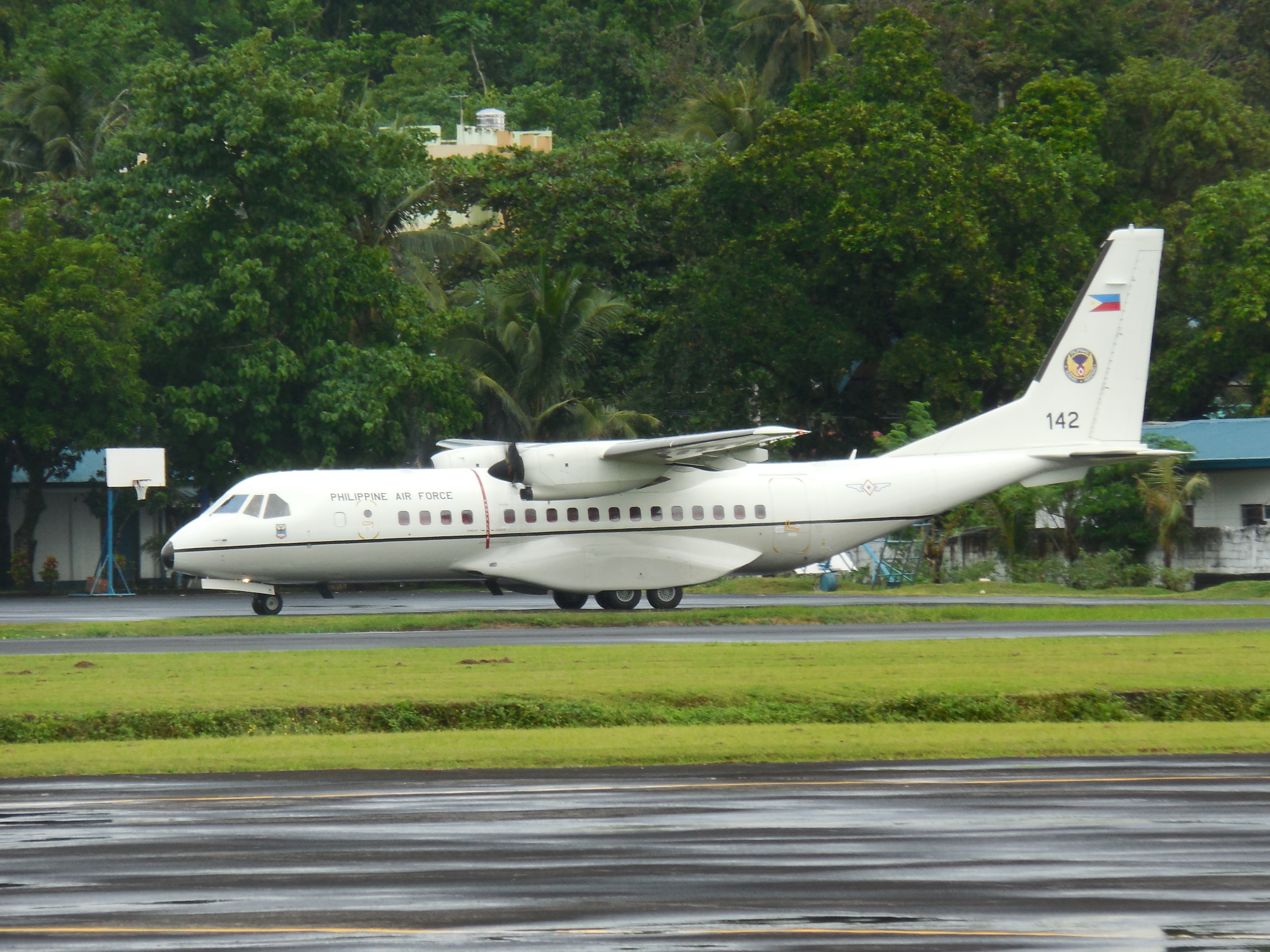
A Philippine Air Force C-295M taxis after landing at Legazpi Airport

Philippines

- The Philippine Air Force 7 units delivered, 4 C-295M and 3 C-295W. Assigned to 220th Airlift Wing of the Air Mobility Command.

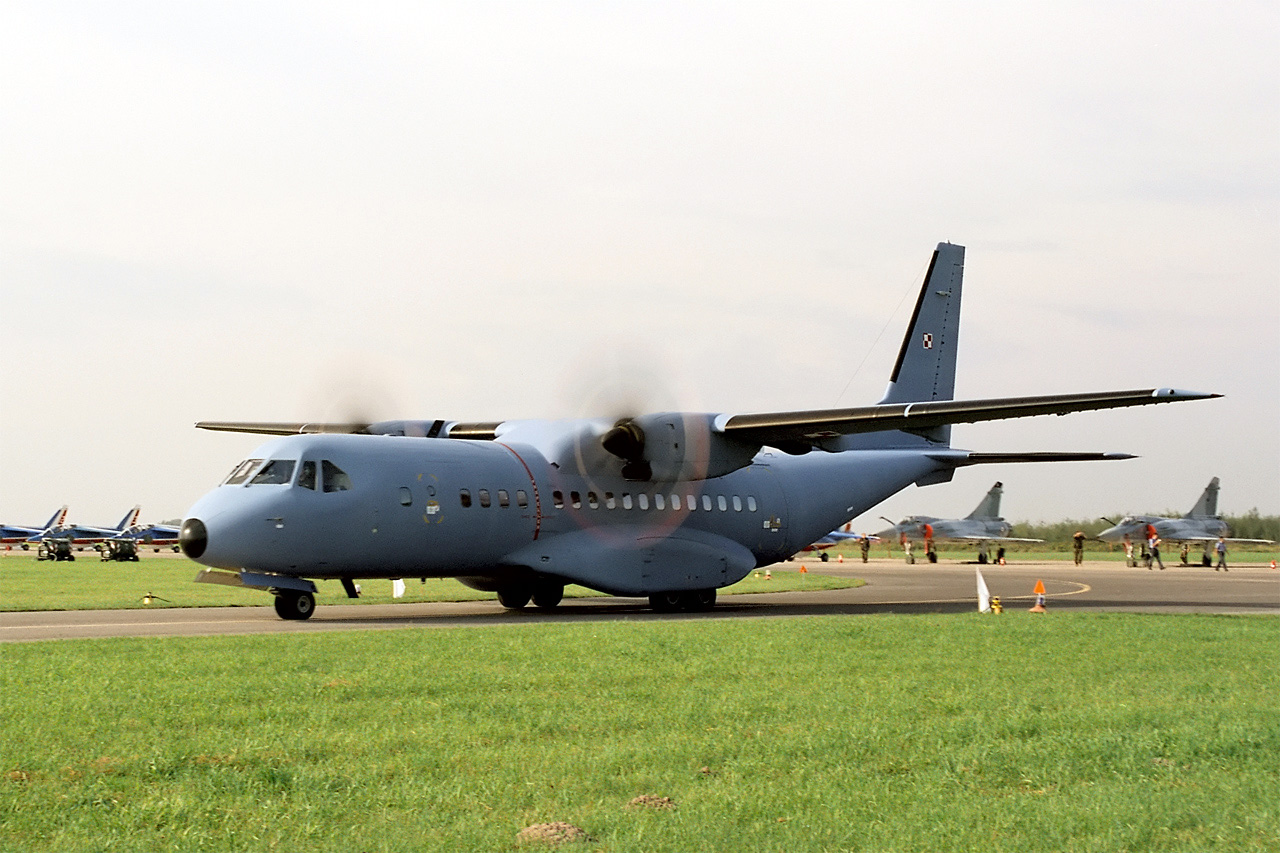
C-295 of the Polish Air Force at the Radom Air Show in 2005

Poland

- The Polish Air Force has received 17 C-295s, one of which has been lost in a crash. The service is the first export customer for the aircraft, first ordering it in 2001.

Portugal

- The Portuguese Air Force received 12 C-295s, including seven transport (PG01) and five Persuader Maritime Patrol Aircraft (C-295 MPA, three PG02 and two PG03), to replace the C-212 Aviocar. They are operated by 502 Squadron and are based at Montijo Air Base, near Lisbon.

Saudi Arabia

- Saudi Arabia's Ministry of Interior ordered four C-295Ws in June 2015.

Senegal

- The Senegalese Air Force received one C-295W in July 2022 and has another on order.

Serbia

- The Serbian Air Force and Air Defence operates two C-295Ws, delivered in 2023.

Spain

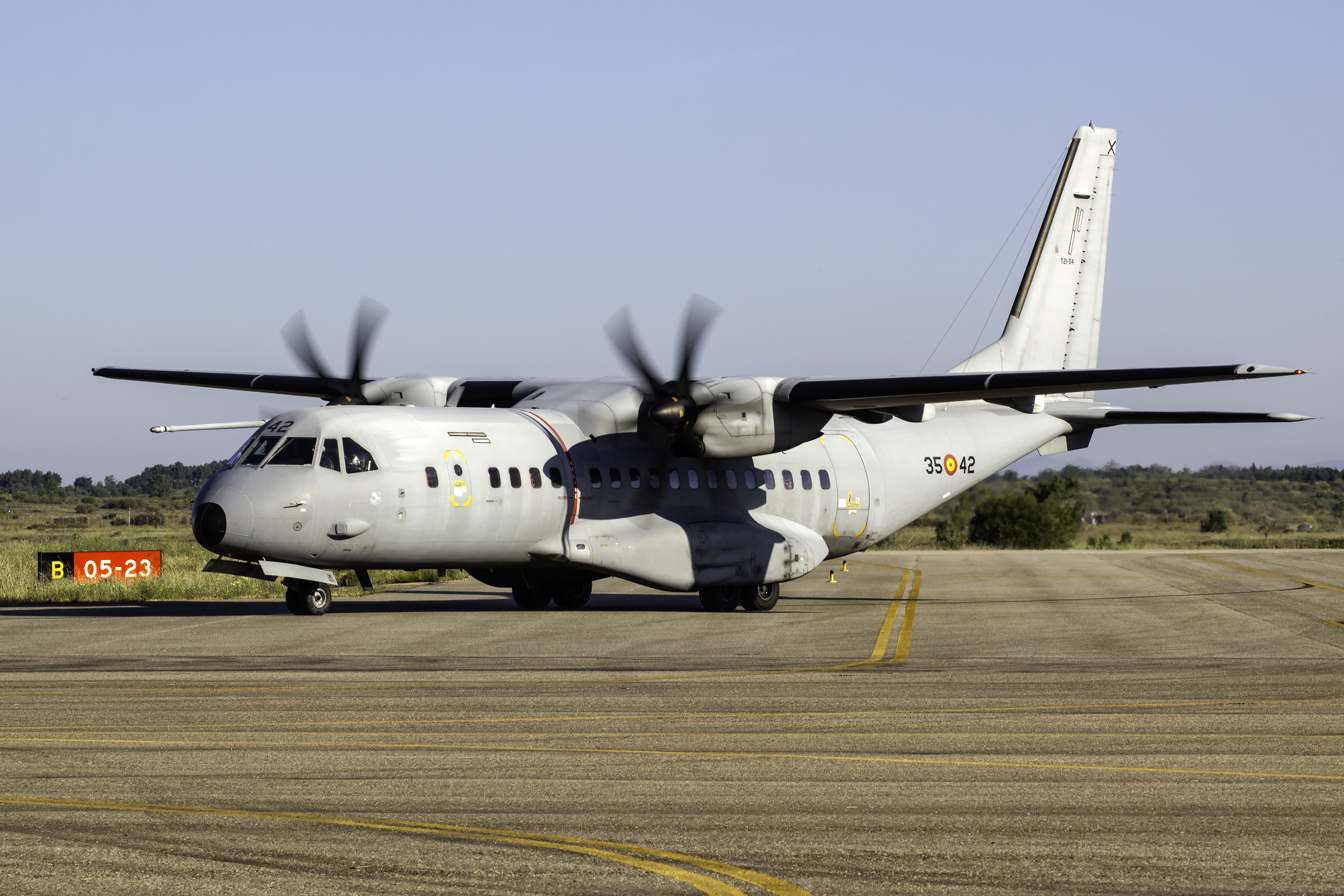
C-295 T.21-04 from the 35th Wing of the Spanish Air and Space Force

- The Spanish Air and Space Force operates 13 C-295s (designated internally T.21). In June 2023, a further 16 units, 6 in MPA configuration and 10 in MSA configuration, were ordered to replace the force's recently retired P-3 Orion and the CN-235 D.4 aircraft.

Thailand

- The Royal Thai Army operates three C-295Ws.
- The Royal Thai Air Force ordered two C-295s.
- The Royal Thai Navy ordered two C-295s.

United Arab Emirates

- The United Arab Emirates Air Force ordered five C-295Ws.

United States

- The United States Air Force has 6 Airbus C-295Ws in use as of 2025, operated by the 427th Special Operations Squadron based at Pope Army Airfield In North Carolina.

Uzbekistan

- The Uzbekistan Air and Air Defence Forces ordered four C-295Ws.

Vietnam

- The Vietnam People's Air Force operates three C-295 aircraft.

== Accidents and notable incidents ==
- In the Mirosławiec air accident on 23 January 2008, a Polish Air Force C-295 flying from Warsaw via Powidz and Krzesiny to Mirosławiec crashed during its approach to the 12th Air Base near Mirosławiec. All 20 people on board were killed in the accident. All Polish C-295s were grounded after the incident. Polish defence minister Bogdan Klich dismissed five air force personnel after the accident investigation, which concluded that multiple failings contributed to 23 January crash.
- On 31 October 2011, the Czech Army grounded its fleet of four C-295Ms due to an in-flight equipment failure onboard one aircraft. While landing, one of its two engines stopped working. Prior to this, a cockpit display and other equipment had also failed. The plane landed safely on its remaining engine. General Vlastimil Picek ordered the grounding of all aircraft until an inquiry ended. The fleet was previously grounded in February 2011, following a severe drop in altitude in mid-flight, and again in May due to avionics problems.
- On 9 November 2012, an Algerian Air Force C-295 crashed in the Lozère region of southern France while flying from Paris to Algeria with the loss of all six people on board.
- On 1 November 2024, a Philippine Air Force C-295 suffered a detached front nose landing gear tyre upon landing at Basco Airport on Batanes island. The cargo transport plane was carrying family food packs and other relief goods for the residents of Batanes who were battered by typhoon "Leon" a few days earlier. No injuries were reported among the military crew members. The cause of the incident was being investigated.

== Specifications (C-295W) ==
=== General characteristics ===
Airbus.com

- Capacity: 70 soldiers, 48 paratroops, 24 stretchers along with up to seven medical attendants, five standard 108" pallets of cargo, or three Land Rover-sized light vehicles.
- Cabin Dimensions: 12.69 × 2.70 × 1.90 meters (41.63 x 8.858 x 6.23 feet)
- Length: 24.50 m (80 ft)
- Wing span: 27.59 m (91 ft)
- Height: 8.66 m (28 ft)
- Maximum Payload: 9,000 kg (19,842 lb)
- Maximum takeoff weight: 23,200 kg (51,147 lb)
- Maximum landing weight: 23,200 kg (51,147 lb)
- Fuel Capacity: 7,500 L (2,000 US gal; 1,600 imp gal)
- Engine Type: 2 x Pratt & Whitney Canada PW127G
- Engine Power: 2,645 shp (1,972 kW)

=== Performance ===
- Cruising Speed: 260 kn (482 km/h; 299 mph)
- Ferry Range: 5,750 km (3,573 mi)

- Range with 3,000 kg (6,614 lb) payload: 5,000 km (3,107 mi)
- Range with 6,000 kg (13,228 lb) payload: 3,704 km (2,302 mi)

- Service Ceiling: 7,620 m (25,000 ft)
- Absolute Ceiling: 9,145 m (30,003 ft)
- Take-off run: 670 m (2,198 ft) Sea level, ISA
- Landing run: 320 m (1,050 ft) Sea level, ISA
- Hardpoints: six (optional: three under each wing)
- Hardpoint capacity: inboard pylons 800 kg (1,764 lb); centre pylons 500 kg (1,102 lb); outboard pylons 300 kg (661 lb)

== See also ==
Related development

- CASA/IPTN CN-235

Aircraft of comparable role, configuration, and era

- Alenia C-27J Spartan
- Antonov An-32
- Antonov/Taqnia An-132
- Ilyushin Il-112
- ATR 72
