= 502 Squadron =

502 Squadron may refer to:

- No. 502 Squadron RAF, of the Royal Air Force
- 502 Squadron (Portugal), of the Portuguese Air Force
