= 2016 Portuguese Air Force Lockheed C-130 crash =

2016 aviation accident in Portugal

- 16804, the aircraft involved in the accident, pictured in 2014

Accident
- Date: 11 July 2016
- Summary: Loss of control during an aborted take off due to pilot error
- Site: Montijo Air Base, Setúbal District, Portugal; 38°42′33″N 09°01′40″W

Aircraft
- Aircraft type: Lockheed C-130H Hercules
- Operator: Portuguese Air Force
- Registration: 16804
- Flight origin: Montijo Air Base, Setúbal District, Portugal
- Destination: Montijo Air Base, Setúbal District, Portugal
- Occupants: 7
- Crew: 7
- Fatalities: 3
- Injuries: 4
- Survivors: 4

On 11 July 2016, a Lockheed C-130H Hercules operated by the Portuguese Air Force crashed during a training flight at Montijo Air Base, Setúbal District, Portugal. Three of the seven people on board were killed and one was injured. The military investigation into the accident found out that the crash, which occurred during take off, was caused by errors of the trainee pilots in aborting the manouver. The crew members were training on performing such manouvers.

== Background ==
The aircraft involved in the accident was a Lockheed C-130H Hercules registered as 16804 and manufactured in 1977. The aircraft was being used on a training flight and operated by the 501st flight squadron of the Portuguese Air Force. On board there were seven crew members, all military personnel.

== Accident ==
The aircraft was performing touch-and-goes to let the crew members train on evasive manouvers. The aircraft then prepared to take off to let the pilots attempt an aborted take off procedure. As the airplane accelerated down the runway the pilots lost control of it and started to veer right, ending up off the runway, at around 1500 meteres form hit. After leaving the runway the plane's right section of the landing gear caught fire, the fire later spread to the rest of the aircraft and caused two engines to explode. Is reported that shortly before the accident the captain radioed the ATC signaling that he had issues with the plane's instruments. After the crash four crew members managed to escape through the cockpit windows, and survived with minor to serious injuries, while three others remained trapped inside the fuselage, due to the fire compromising the plane's structure and the fumes released by it, and died. Initial reports that stated that two crew members died trying to rescue the third trapped one were later dismissed by military authorities. The crash was the first involving a Lockheed C-130 of the Portuguese Air Force.

=== Rescue operations ===
Forty-eight firefighters and fifteen fire engines were deployed to the scene to suppress the post-crash fire. The fire took hours to be put out. On 12 July, the day after the crash, the wreckge was removed from the site.

=== Victims ===
The three victims were all from the Portuguese military, they were lieutenant colonel Fernando Castro, who was the aircraft pilot, trainee pilot André Saramago and sergent Amândio Novais, who was the loadmaster on this flight.

== Reactions ==
The Portuguese Minister of National Defence José Alberto Azeredo Lopes and the chief of staff of the Portuguese Air Force Manuel Rolo visited the air base a few hours after the crash, where they met the injured and the families of the victims. The two also held an extraordinary meeting regarding the accident later that day in Braga. Following the crash questions raised regarding the aging portuguese fleet of Lockheed C-130s and if they should have been retired and substituted with newer models. Portuguese president Marcelo Rebelo de Sousa visited the air base a week after the accident. During the visit he stated that an investigation into the accident was ongoing and that the air force "had trust in its Lockheed C-130 fleet".

A ceremony was held at Montijo Air Base on the third anniversary of the accident.

== Investigation ==
The day after the crash the Portuguese Air Force launched an investigation into the accident, which concluded in October 2016 with the release of a final report. In the final report the investigators stated that the crash occurred while the crew were practicing an aborted take off maneuver. As the procedure started the flight instructor increased engine power to test if the trainee managed to complete the maneuver in this new condition. But due to his inexperience the trainee lost control of the airplane, causing it to veer off the runway and catch fire. The report explicitly stated that the trainee wasn't at fault for the crash since he was put in a situation for which he wasn't trained before. The Air Force recommended for future training flights that only maneuvers described in the official training manual for the C-130 should be performed during training flights.

== See also ==
- 2015 Jalalabad USAF C-130J crash, another C-130 that crashed on take off due to pilot error
