= Gintaras Zelvys =

- Born: Lithuania
- Died: 2013; Rathcoole, County Dublin, Ireland
- Cause of death: Firearms

Details
- Imprisoned at: Castlerea Prison

Gintaras Zelvys was a criminal born in Lithuania who was shot dead in Rathcoole, 2013.

He was a father of one.

== Criminal history ==
He had convictions for rape, robbery and jailbreaking. In 2006 he was charged with unauthorised taking of a car in Kilcock and being a passenger in a stolen car. He was convicted of extortion against a fellow Lithuanian in 2007. He was deported in February 2013 after his release from Castlerea Prison but he returned to Ireland the weekend before he was shot.

== Death ==
He and his wife arrived at his "cash for clothes" business on Grants Crescent in the Greenogue Industrial Estate outside Rathcoole on 1 May 2013. The shooting happened around 9:30 am on 1 May 2013. The gunmen made their escape in a silver Audi A3. After he was shot he was taken to Tallaght University Hospital where he was declared dead.

Three men were arrested about his murder on 14 May 2013.
