= Murder of Wayne Whelan =

2019 Irish gangland killing

The murder of Wayne Whelan took place in Lucan, Dublin in 2019. The Irish convicted criminal and known gangster had survived several previous attempts on his life when he was lured to his death by a friend under the guise of watching a football match together. The case is notable as more than seven people would be jailed for their role in the crime, yet no individual has been identified as responsible and charged with Whelan's murder.

== Background ==
=== Joyrider ===
Wayne Whelan was an Irish convicted criminal from Rowlagh in Clondalkin. He first came to the attention of Gardaí in the 1990s as a car thief and joyrider. He was a member of a group of around 20 people ages ranging from 19 to 24 years old. The members were from the Ballyfermot, Ronanstown and Clondalkin area. They were known as the "M50 gang". They were so-called because they would steal cars and use said motorway as a main route into Dublin and surrounding counties where they would carry out robberies.

=== Drug dealing ===
By the time the gang had disbanded Wayne Whelan had moved into dealing in amphetamine and speed.

Whelan later began dealing cocaine and was arrested in Maynooth in December 2005 where he and his gang were operating a cocaine mixing factory. As well as equipment Gardaí found €2.5m worth of cocaine and €100,000 in cash. The High Court found that the District Court had departed from proper procedures and he walked free on 23 December 2005. On 6 May 2006 the case collapsed and charges were withdrawn.

Though he was a major figure in drug dealing in west Dublin, he was never convicted for that and only had convictions for road traffic offences. He spent very little time in jail.

Five years afterwards, he ordered his solicitor to write a letter to RTÉ to complain about the coverage of the case.

=== Partnership with other criminals ===
Whelan began working with two other figures - David "Chen" Lynch and Mark Desmond.

Desmond, known as "Guinea Pig," was a suspect in two murders and was believed to be a paedophile who raped a 15-year-old boy. Whelan testified in his defence when Desmond was charged with four offences of unlawful possession of firearms with intent to endanger life. His testimony changed peoples' attitudes towards him.

Both Whelan and Lynch were targeted by the Criminal Assets Bureau and chose to settle rather than contest the cases.

On 2 December 2016 Mark Desmond went to Griffeen Valley Park to meet someone. He brought a gun with him but hid it in the bushes, so he was unarmed when he was shot six times. He died at the scene. Whelan was arrested and questioned about the murder but Gardaí could never collect enough evidence and neither he nor Lynch were charged.

Lynch was shot dead on 1 March 2019 on the front garden of his house in Foxdene Avenue in Clondalkin. Whelan was a suspect in this murder also. Gardaí also formally warned him his life was in danger.

During this time Whelan's own drug used increased, and the market in the greater Clondalkin area had been taken over by the Kinahan gang.

=== Attempted murder ===
On 4 September 2019 his car was rammed at Griffeen Glen Park near his Lucan home and shots were fired at him. He survived but was hospitalised.

== Death ==
His remains were found in the passenger seat of a burning car in Lucan, Dublin on 18 November 2019 and were so badly burned they had to be identified by DNA profiling. At the time of his death Whelan was 42-years-old.

After his death, the Irish Sun Wayne claimed Whelan was linked to possible involvement in the 2016 killing of Noel Kirwan.

== Investigation ==
=== Murder ===
Two men and a woman were arrested on 12 December 2019.

A woman was arrested on 18 February 2020.

== Court cases ==
=== Attempted murder ===
On 30 September 2020 three men appeared in court charged with the attempted murder of Wayne Whelan in September 2019.

=== Murder case ===
On 17 December two men appeared in court charged with the murder of Wayne Whelan. On 14 May 2020 two people appeared in court charged with the murder of Wayne Whelan.

=== Guilty pleas for attempted murder ===
On 24 May 2021 four men pleaded guilty to the attempted murder of Whelan before the Special Criminal Court. Wayne Ryan, Darren Henderson and two other men who cannot be named for legal reasons pleaded guilty to attempted murder Whelan in the State on dates unknown between 15 May and 15 November 2019, both dates inclusive. They had originally been scheduled to go on trial on 21 June 2021 but that date was vacated following their pleas. They were due to be sentenced on 12 July 2021. Collectively the group was sentenced to 33 years in prison, with Wayne Ryan receiving 15 years.

Later, Cailean Crawford was convicted of conspiracy to murder Whelan. Charles McClean was convicted of conspiracy to murder.

=== Additional charges ===
On 22 January 2022, Whelan's friend Anthony Casserly was sentenced to nine years in prison for his role in luring Whelan outside to his death, under the guise of watching a football match together. Christopher Moran was convicted of impending the apprehension of a suspect when he pleaded guilty to being the getaway driver for Whelan's killer. Moran received four and a half years in prison for his role in the crime. In 2024, Casserly's partner, Lacey O'Connor was convicted of perverting the course of justice after it was found she gave Casserly a false alibi.
