= Greenogue Business Park =

Business campus near Dublin

- Interactive map of Greenogue Business Park
- Coordinates: 53.29836°N 6.47439°W
- Website: http://www.greenoguebusinesspark.com/

Greenogue Business Park is a business park near Rathcoole, County Dublin. It is 1.1km from the Rathcoole interchange on the N7 Road, which is itself 8.5km from the N7/M50 interchange (Junction 9) at the Red Cow interchange.

== Major companies ==
Amazon Logistics leased an e-commerce warehouse in 2020.

== Public transport ==
The number 68 bus travels between Hawkins Street in Dublin City centre and the business park. The number 69 travels between Hawkins Street and nearby Rathcoole.

== History ==
Gintaras Zelvys was shot dead at his business in the estate in 2013.

Declan Brady was arrested when illegally held arms were found in his unit at the park in 2017.
