= Murder of Noel Kirwan =

2016 gangland death in Ireland

Christopher "Noel" Kirwan was shot dead on 22 December 2016. A lifelong friend of Gerry "the Monk" Hutch, Kirwan was uninvolved in crime and considered a "soft target". He was killed on the orders of the Kinahan Organised Crime Group by a cartel hitman. In June 2026, Sean McGovern was found guilty of organising the murder and sentenced to 24 years in prison.

== Background ==
Kirwan lived in Jude's Gardens off Railway Street in Dublin, then lived in Summerhill, Dublin. He was friends with Gerry Hutch and other members of the Hutch family, and he drove Hutch to the funeral of his brother Eddie in 2016. His father worked in the docks and he inherited his nickname, "Duck Egg".

In the 1990s he was involved in the anti-drugs movement. He was charged with possession of a firearm or imitation firearm for intimidation in Ballybough Road in 1996, but people in north inner city Dublin said he had not been involved in crime in some time. He had moved to Kilbarrack some years before being killed and later to Clondalkin with his partner.

Kirwan had been formally notified that his life was in danger shortly after the funeral.

== Shooting ==
It was revealed during the 2026 trial that a Kinahan hitman nicknamed "Teeth", revealed by an Irish Times report to be Glen Clarke, had been chosen to be the hitman. Clarke had previously shot two innocent men, Martin O'Rourke and Trevor O'Neill, in cases of mistaken identity. Clarke was found dead in a stolen car in 2016, having reportedly shot himself in the head by accident; he survived five hours after shooting himself, struggling to breathe before dying of his injuries in hospital several hours later. With Clarke dead, the Kinahan cartel chose another gunman, believed to be a well-known gangland criminal from west Dublin.

Kirwan and his partner had just had lunch with her daughter in Crumlin, and were sitting in the car outside their home in Clondalkin when he was shot six times with a Makarov handgun.

== Aftermath ==
=== Trial of Jason Keating ===
Jason Keating was put on trial for murdering Kirwan, but the murder charge was dropped when he admitted participating in the activities of a criminal gang and helping them to murder Kirwan.

A tracker device had been fitted to the underside of Kirwan's car and Keating took part in retrieving it and transferring it to his new car two days before he was killed. Keating was in the getaway car, talking to the person following the tracker on a laptop and passing on the information to the gunman. He brought the gunman to and from the crime scene and was involved via CCTV footage and the purchase of a "burner" phone. Keating was sentenced to ten years in prison. Gardaí told the special criminal court that the only motive they could find for his killing was his association with the Monk.

=== 2022 trials ===
On 14 April 2022 Declan Brady and Martin Aylmer were charged with involvement in the murder, contrary to Section 72 of the Criminal Justice Act. Brady is a senior member of the Kinahan Organised Crime Group. Michael Crotty was charged with involvement on 12 April 2022. In July 2022 Martin Aylmer was sentenced to eight years and four months for assisting with Kirwan's murder and the attempted murder of James 'Mago' Gately in 2017.

In May 2024 Michael Crotty was sentenced to two years for buying top-up credit for a phone used in Kirwan's murder. In June 2024, Declan Brady was sentenced to ten years in jail with the final year suspended for his involvement with the murder. Brady, who claimed that he is no longer affiliated with the Kinahan gang, was already serving sentences for money laundering and firearms offences. The final year of his sentence was suspended on condition that Brady continued disassociating from the gang.

=== 2026 conviction of Sean McGovern ===
On 29 May 2025, Kinahan Cartel lieutenant Sean McGovern was extradited from the UAE to Ireland where he was placed under arrest and subsequently charged with the murder. On 16 March 2026, he pleaded guilty to directing a criminal gang. In June 2026, he was sentenced to 24 years in prison for directing activities of a criminal gang, including his involvement in the murder of Kirwan and another attempted murder of Hutch gang member James "Mago" Gately.

== See also ==
- Murder of Wayne Whelan
