= 601 Squadron =

601 Squadron or 601st Squadron may refer to:

- No. 601 Squadron RAF, of the United Kingdom Royal Air Force
- 601 Squadron (Israel), of the Israeli Air Force
- 601 Squadron (Portugal), of the Portuguese Air Force
- 601st Bombardment Squadron, of the United States Air Force
