= 504 Squadron (Portugal) =

- Esquadra 504
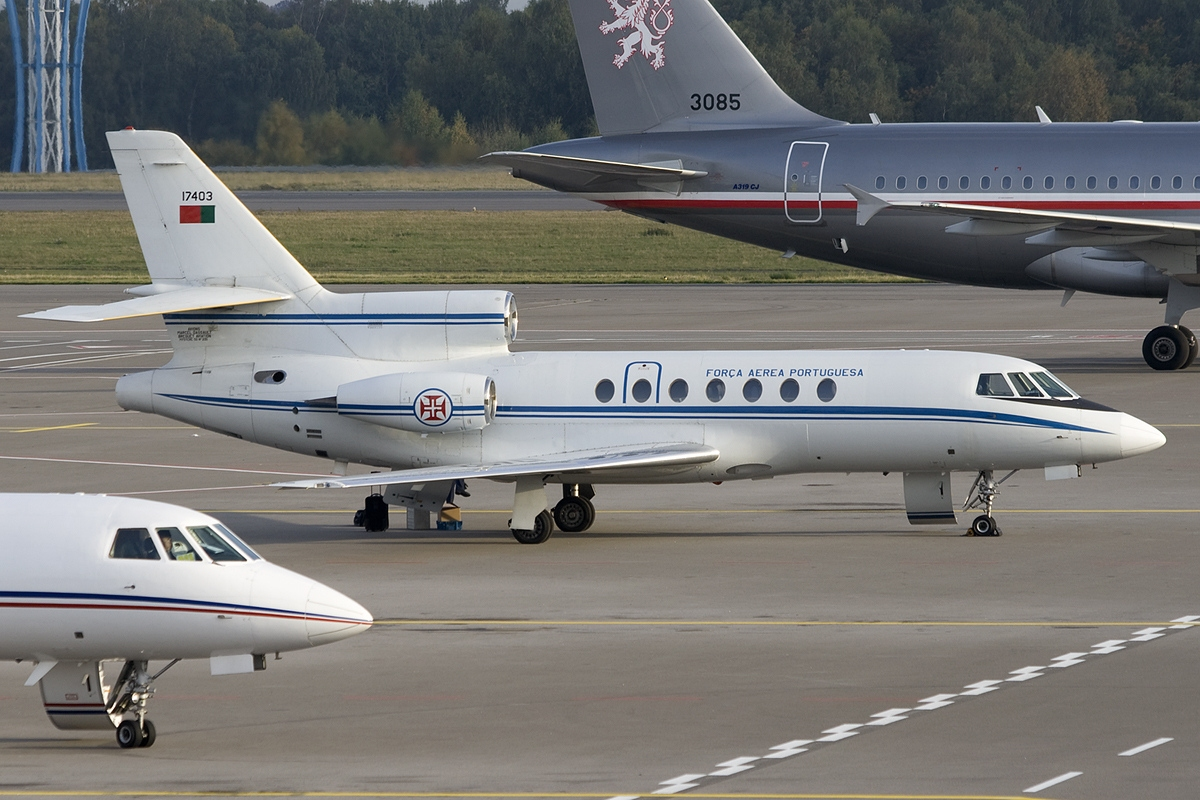
- Dassault Falcon 50 of 504 Squadron
- Active: January 12, 1985
- Country: Portugal
- Branch: Portuguese Air Force
- Role: VIP Transport
- Part of: Operational Group 61
- Garrison/HQ: Air Base No. 6
- Nickname: Linces (Lynxes)
- Motto: «Entre gente remota edificaram»
- Mascot: Iberian lynx
- Website: Esquadra 504

Commanders
- Commander: Major João Filipe Dias Gaião Ribeiro Valente

Aircraft flown
- Transport: Dassault Falcon 50 Dassault Falcon 900

504 Squadron "Linces" (Esquadra 504) is a special transport squadron of the Portuguese Air Force (PoAF). The unit operates the Dassault Falcon 50, and is based at Air Base No. 6, in Montijo, and also operates from the Lisbon Portela Airport.

The squadron is responsible for VIP transport of high level government officials, medical evacuation, urgent transport of human organs for transplant, and verification and calibration of navigational aids.

== History ==
The squadron was officially formed on January 12, 1985, at Air Base No. 6 (Portuguese: Base Aérea Nº 6, BA6) upon the purchase of three Dassault Falcon 20, from Federal Express in 1984, for the transport of high level officials of the Portuguese government.

Two Dassault Falcon 50 were later acquired in 1989 and one more was purchased in 1991 to reinforce the squadron's aircraft fleet.

Starting from 1990 the squadron was permanently detached to the Transit Airfield No. 1 (Portuguese: Aeródromo de Trânsito Nº 1, AT1) in Lisbon.

== Aircraft ==
- Dassault Falcon 20DC (1984–2005)
- Dassault Falcon 50 (1989–current)
- Dassault Falcon 900 (2023-current)

== See also ==
- Air transports of heads of state and government
- Air medical services
- Portuguese Air Force
- List of aircraft of the Portuguese Air Force
