= Sean McGovern =

Irish criminal

Still image of Sean Gerard McGovern created by the U.S. Office of Foreign Assets Control in 2022

Sean Gerard McGovern is an Irish criminal and part of the Kinahan Organised Crime Group. Described as a "senior lieutenant" of the Kinahan group, McGovern is currently serving a 24-year sentence for directing the activities of a criminal organisation, including the murder of Noel Kirwan.

== Early life ==
McGovern is originally from Drimnagh in Dublin.

== Criminal career ==
Sean Gerard McGovern (bottom row, on the left) as depicted on a chart of the Kinahan Organized Crime Group created by the U.S. Office of Foreign Assets Control in 2022

McGovern is an associate of Liam Byrne who ran the Byrne Organised Crime Group, the Dublin branch of the Kinahan Organised Crime Group. He is wanted in Ireland in connection with the murder of Noel "Duck Egg" Kirwan, a close associate of Gerry Hutch killed as part of the Kinahan-Hutch feud.

McGovern was shot during the killing of David Byrne at the Regency Hotel. He was approached by a Garda who asked him what happened, but he refused to cooperate with the Garda.

The Criminal Assets Bureau raided Liam Byrne's companies and the High Court found them not to be legitimate businesses. McGovern was also targeted and his assets were seized as he was part of the Byrne Organised Crime Group. McGovern, Byrne and other gang members left Ireland for Dubai. He was arrested in Dubai in October 2024 on foot of an Interpol red notice.

His former home in Dublin was seized by the Criminal Assets Bureau in March 2019 and purchased by Dublin City Council. McGovern had bought the property in 2015 for €150,000 from an Investec bank in Mauritius via a trust company. He spent €247,000 on renovations. Both the purchase and renovations were found to be funded by the proceeds of crime. Days before the house was seized, it was vandalised. Attempts to renovate it have been prevented by threats against the contractors hired.

On 29 May 2025, McGovern was extradited from the UAE to Ireland where he was placed under arrest and subsequently charged with the murder of Noel Kirwan. On 16 March 2026, he pleaded guilty to directing a criminal gang. In June 2026, he was sentenced to 24 years in prison for directing activities of a criminal gang, including his involvement in the murder of Noel Kirwan and the attempted murder of Hutch gang member James "Mago" Gately.
