= 502 Squadron (Portugal) =

- Esquadra 502
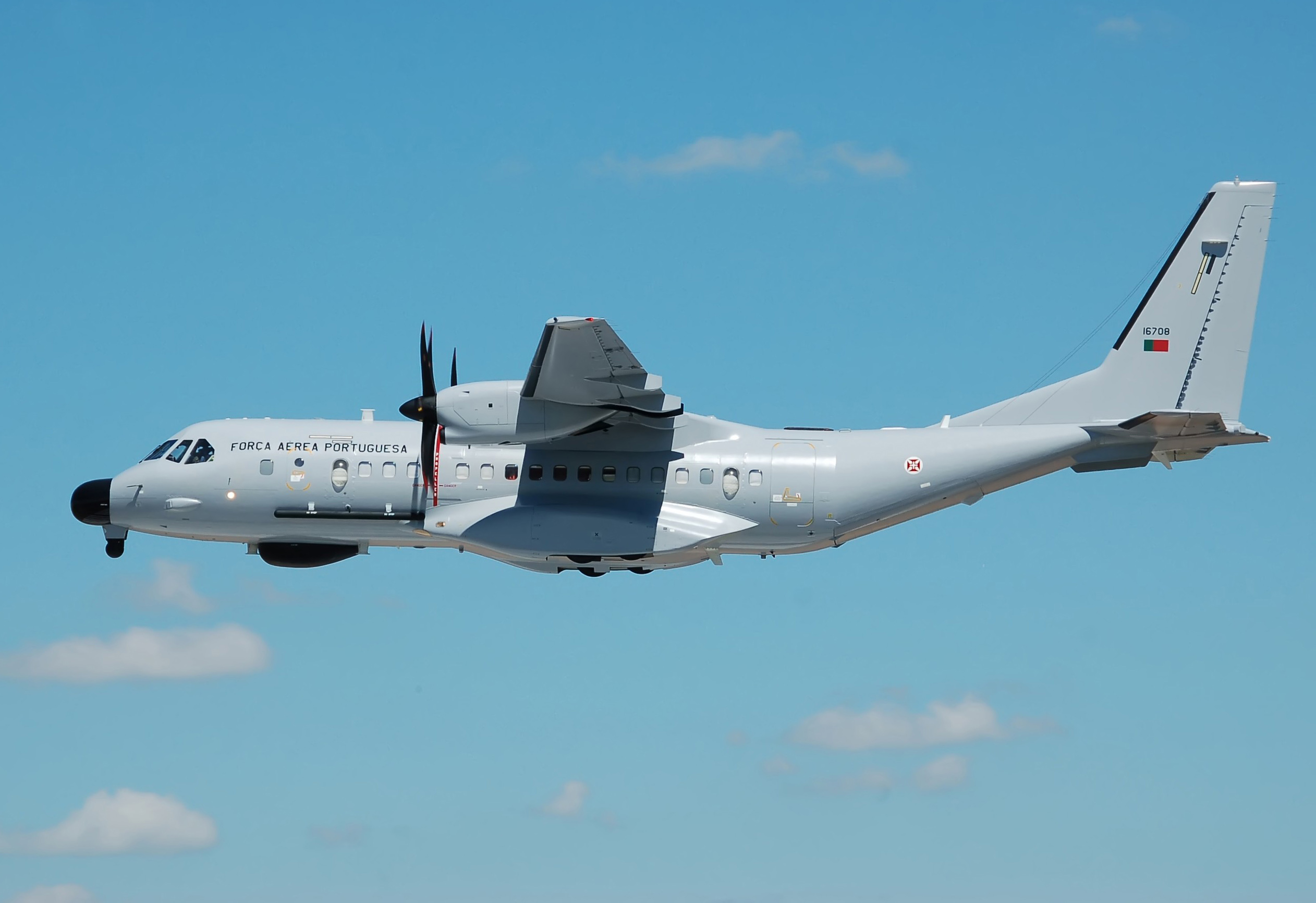
- Portuguese Air Force C-295M
- Active: 1978
- Country: Portugal
- Branch: Air Force
- Role: Tactical air transport operations
- Air Base: Air Base No. 6
- Nickname: Elefantes (Elephants)
- Motto: Sobre as Asas Ínclitas da Fama (Over the Distinguished Wings of Fame)
- Mascot: Elephant

Commanders
- Commander: Maj. João Henrique Ferreira Maia

Aircraft flown
- Transport: EADS CASA C-295

The 502 Squadron "Elefantes" (Esquadra 502) is a transport squadron of the Portuguese Air Force. Its primary mission is tactical air transport and has the secondary mission of providing additional pilot training in multi-engine aircraft and in navigation, search and rescue, and general air transport.

== History ==
The squadron dates back to 1937, when the then Portuguese Army's air arm (Aeronáutica Militar) was equipped with Junkers Ju 52/3m aircraft, with the creation of two bomber groups (Grupo de Bombardeamento de Dia and Grupo de Bombardeamento de Noite). In the 1940s these aircraft were distributed between Sintra Air Base (BA1) and Ota Air Base (BA2) and also assigned the transport role.

The creation of the Portuguese Air Force brought major changes to the military aviation in Portugal and the creation of the Portuguese paratrooper units in the Air Force. One Ju 52 was then assigned to the paratroopers based at Tancos Air Base (BA3). On January 11, 1955, the Training and Liaison Flight (Portuguese: Esquadrilha de Ligação e Treino, ELT) was established with Captain Fernando Gomes dos Santos being appointed as its commander. This flight was equipped with 22 Piper L-21 aircraft, which also provided support to the Army's units, and two Airspeed Oxford for training.

With the expanding of the missions assigned to the ELT it was decided to create a new squadron which would take on its missions and personnel. On April 12, 1956, the Esquadra Mista was created with two flights, one of liaison and training with the L-21 and Oxford aircraft, and a second of transport with five Ju 52. In December 1959 this squadron was disbanded thus resulting in the creation of the Heavy Aircraft Navigation and Complement Instruction Squadron (Portuguese: Esquadra de Instrução Complementar de Pilotagem e Navegação em Aviões Pesados, EICPNAP), which was in fact used primary for parachute operations. On November and December 1960 France delivers 15 new Amiot AAC-1 (French built Ju 52) aircraft, with most of them being assigned to EICPNAP.

In 1963, with the beginning of the Ultramar War, the Air Force increased the size of the parachute troops and started introducing new parachuting techniques. This led to the disbandment of the EICPNAP and to its replacement with the Parachute Troops Transport and Training Squadron (Portuguese: Esquadra de Treino e Transporte de Tropas Paraquedistas, ETTTP). The unit kept all the same infrastructures and resources of the former EICPNAP and adopted a turtle as its mascot, which was the nicknamed then given to the Ju 52.

The ETTTP was then disbanded in 1971 and in its place 32 Squadron was created with the Nord Noratlas and until 1972 a few Ju 52 aircraft. With the adoption of the modern Noratlas, the squadrons missions expand from only parachute operations to general transport, including flights to Azores, Madeira, and the oversea territories. Later the Air Force Multi-engine School was reactivated in the squadron. With the end of the war the Noratlas continue to be operated by 32 Squadron until 1976.

Between October and November 1974 the first CASA C-212-100 Aviocar started being delivered, with the last aircraft being delivered on April 9, 1976. The navigation and multi-engine aircraft instruction and training mission of 32 Squadron is then given to 111 Squadron, which also receives the helicopter instruction and training mission.

In 1978, 32 Squadron is disbanded and 502 Squadron is established and equipped with the Aviocar. 502 Squadron also took over the Madeira Air Detachment (Portuguese: Destacamento Aéreo da Madeira, DAM) at Madeira.

From October 1988 to February 2008, the squadron also kept an detachment at São Tomé and Príncipe for medical evacuation between the islands and if necessary to the continent (to Gabon or to Ivory Coast), general air transport between São Tomé and Príncipe, air transport of the Portuguese embassy personnel, support of search and rescue missions. The detachment operated one Aviocar in a 24-hour alert, having flow 5,500 hours and having transported 50,000 passengers.

In 2007, 711 Squadron, at Lajes Air Base (BA4) ends its operations with the Aviocar, handing over transport operations to 502 Squadron, which established the Azores Air Detachment (Portuguese: Destacamento Aéreo dos Açores, DAA) At that same year the Air Force purchases 12 new EADS CASA C-295, seven of the transport variant (C-295M) and five in the maritime patrol variant (C-295MPA), to replace the Aviocar fleet.

In 2009 the squadron is transferred from Sintra to the Montijo Air Base (BA6) and in February of that year the first C-295 was delivered.

With the disbandment of the 401 Squadron "Cientistas" (Scientists) on December 6, 2011, the aerial photographic reconnaissance mission was then assigned to 502 Squadron.

== Aircraft ==
- CASA C-212-100 Aviocar (1978–2010)
- Cessna Skymaster FTB-337G (2005–2007)
- EADS CASA C-295 (2009–current)

== Air bases ==
- Tancos Air Base (Air Base No. 3) (1978–1993)
- Sintra Air Base (Air Base No. 1) (1993–2009)
- Montijo Air Base (Air Base No. 6) (2009–current)

== See also ==
- Portuguese Air Force
- 401 Squadron
- 505 Flight
- 711 Squadron
- Parachute Troops School
- List of aircraft of the Portuguese Air Force
- Frontex
- Exercise Real Thaw
