= CMC Aviation =

Kenyan airline

IATA	ICAO	Call sign
JX	-	-
- Ceased operations: 2011
- Hubs: Wilson Airport
- Fleet size: 10
- Headquarters: Nairobi, Kenya
- Website: http://dacaviation.com

CMC Aviation was a charter airline based in Nairobi, Kenya at Wilson Airport. It was acquired by DAC Aviation International in August 2006 and was rebranded as DAC Aviation (EA) Limited in 2011.

== Fleet ==
The CMC Aviation fleet included the following aircraft (as of 4 July 2009):

- 7 Bombardier Dash 8-100 (two aircraft are operated for ECHO, two aircraft are operated for the United Nations and one aircraft is operated for Dove Air Services)
- 3 Bombardier Dash 8-300 (which are operated for the United Nations)
