= Mais Alto =

Portuguese language aviation magazine

- Director: Lt. Col./PILAV João Lopes da Silva
- Categories: Aviation, History, Military
- Circulation: 3,000 (2012)
- First issue: April 1959
- Company: Portuguese Air Force
- Country: Portugal
- Based in: Amadora, Lisbon
- Language: Portuguese
- Website: www.emfa.pt/www/po/maisalto/

Mais Alto is a Portuguese language aviation magazine published by the Portuguese Air Force since 1959. It is sold in Portugal and also has subscribers in Australia, Belgium, Brazil, Italy, Finland, France, Netherlands, United Kingdom, Spain, Sweden, Germany, Uruguay, Mexico, United States, and South Africa.
