= Declan Brady =

Irish criminal convicted of firearms and money laundering offences

Declan Brady, also known as Mr Nobody, is an Irish criminal with convictions for possession of firearms and money laundering. He is a senior figure in the Kinahan Organised Crime Group founded by Christy Kinahan.

== Early life ==
Brady grew up in Drimnagh. His father was a haulier. He left school at 14 and worked for his father and eventually got his own truck licence.

== Criminal career ==
=== Possession of firearms ===
In July 2019 he pleaded guilty in the Special Criminal Court to possessing nine revolvers, four semi-automatic pistols, a sub-machine gun, an assault rifle and 1,355 rounds of ammunition at a unit in Greenogue Business Park, Rathcoole, County Dublin. The firearms were found in a unit that was purported to be an office of a legitimate UK logistics company that has no offices in Ireland. Firearms were found in the upstairs loft area during a search on 24 January 2017.

He was sentenced to eleven and a half years. Two other men were also convicted.

=== Money laundering ===
He was charged in February 2021 with 16 non-scheduled offences under Section 7 of the Criminal Justice Act 2021. The charges related to money laundering and terrorist financing within the Republic of Ireland. All the offences he was alleged to have committed took place between 1 January 2012 and 24 January 2017. In April 2021 he pleaded guilty in the Special Criminal Court to hiding €268,000 in the loft of a premises in Naas.

At a further hearing on 14 June 2021, Brady, his wife and Lukacs all pleaded guilty to further money laundering charges. Brady declared "no gross income" from 2013 to 2017, but had five bank accounts and admitted laundering over €418,000. His wife Deirdre also told Revenue she had no income, but had eight bank accounts and admitted laundering €770,000. She also admitted transferring over €140,000 to a Spanish account of Thomas Kavanagh over five years. She paid €3,000 a month to her husband's Spanish mortgage account for a property in Cala d'Or, more than €138,000 between 2014 and 2016. The couple paid over €66,000 to the Druids Glen hotel for the wedding of a relative. Mrs Brady unwittingly paid the rent on a property lived in by her husband and Ms. Lukacs.

All three have paid money to the Criminal Assets Bureau. The Bradys were assessed as owing €622,929 and still owe €173,649. They have sold properties in Firhouse, Wolstan Abbey and in Tavira to pay over €449,000. The properties in Cala d'Or were seized by a Spanish bank.

Lukacs settled with the Criminal Assets Bureau for €71,327.

The three were sentenced in July 2021 with Declan Brady being jailed for seven years and three months for laundering crime cash while his wife and Lukacs received three-year suspended sentences.

=== Murder of Noel Kirwan ===
In June 2024, Brady was sentenced to ten years in jail with the final year suspended for his involvement with the killing. Brady, who claimed that he is no longer affiliated with the Kinahan gang, is already serving sentences for money laundering and firearms offences. The final year of his sentence was suspended on condition that Brady continued disassociating from the gang.

== Personal life ==
He is married, but has separated from his wife and is in a relationship with a Hungarian national with whom he has a young daughter, who has a rare genetic disorder. He was living in Celbridge at the time of his firearms conviction.

== Other ==
He was a senior mourner at the funeral of David Byrne, who was killed in a shooting at the Regency Hotel. He was known as "Mr Nobody" because Gardaí did not know who he was until the funeral.
