= Montijo Air Base =

Basis of the Portuguese Air Force

Montijo Air Base Air Base 6
- Base Aérea do Montijo; Base Aérea Nº 6
- Montijo, Setúbal in Portugal
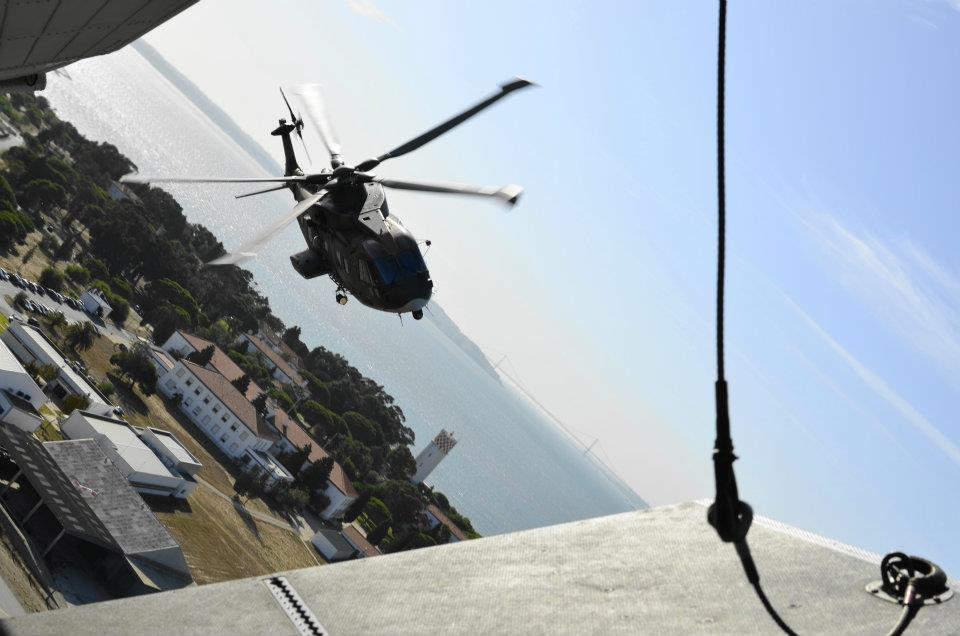
- A Portuguese Air Force AW101 Merlin breaks formation over Montijo AB

- Força e Grandeza de Ânimo (Portuguese for 'Strength and greatness of mind')

Site information
- Type: Military airfield
- Owner: Ministry of National Defence
- Operator: Portuguese Air Force
- Controlled by: Air Command
- Condition: Operational
- Website: Official website

Location
- Location in Portugal
- Coordinates: 38°42′14″N 9°2′9″W

Site history
- Built: 1952
- In use: 1952 – present

Garrison information
- Current commander: Colonel Antonio Carlos da Costa Nascimento

Airfield information
- Identifiers: ICAO: LPMT, WMO: 085340
- Elevation: 14 metres (46 ft) --> AMSL
Runways
Direction	Length and surface
01/19	2,147 metres (7,044 ft) Asphalt
08/26	2,440 metres (8,005 ft) Concrete
- Source: World Aero Data

Montijo Air Base (Portuguese: Base Aérea do Montijo) (ICAO: LPMT) - officially known as Air Base No. 6 (Base Aérea n.º 6) or BA6 - is a military air base located in Montijo, Portugal. The base is home to three transport squadrons and one helicopter search and rescue squadron and provides logistic support to the Portuguese Navy's helicopters based there.

== History ==
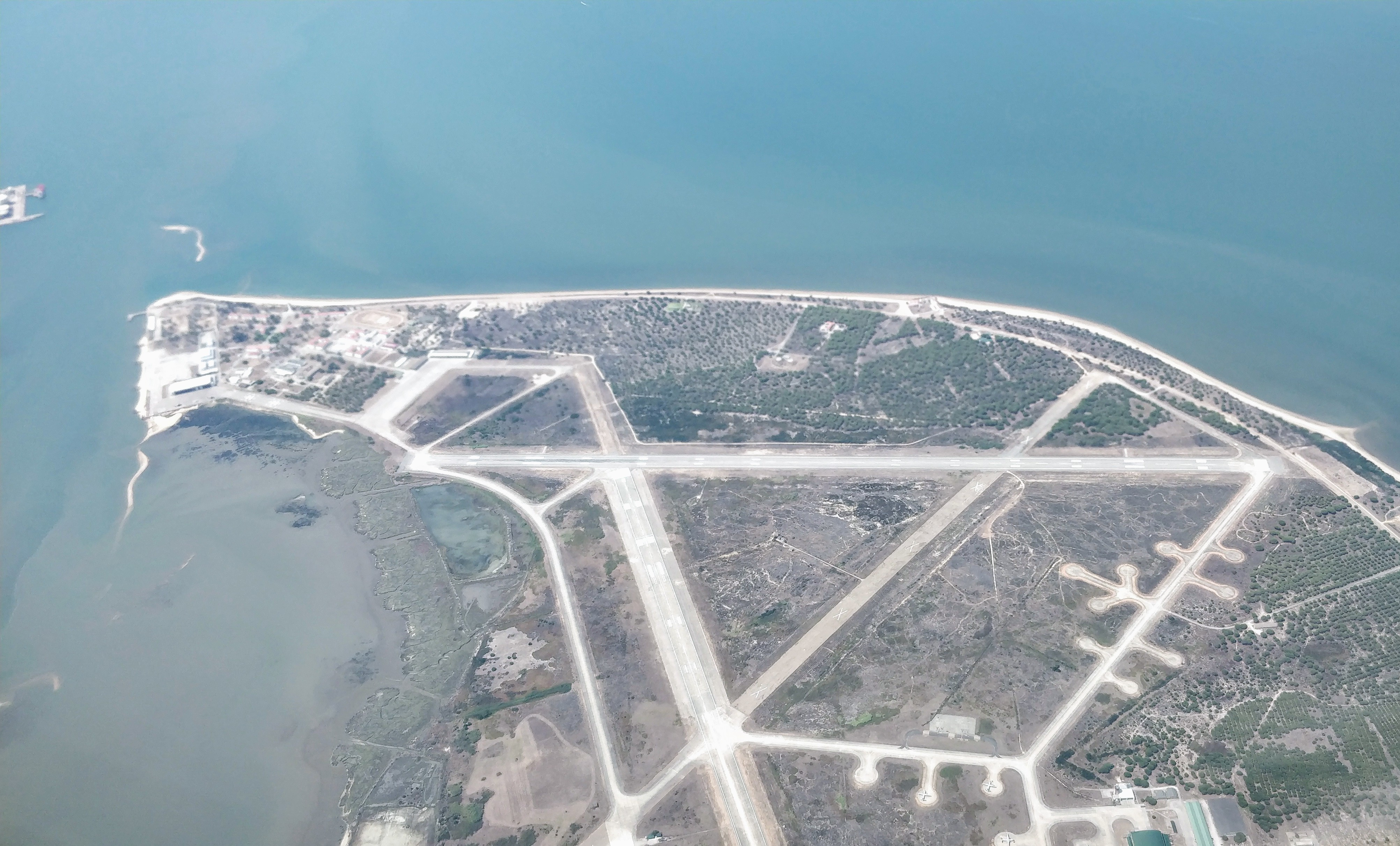
An aerial view of Montijo Air Base during 2019

The Montijo Air Base started to be built by the Portuguese Navy, before World War II, to replace its Naval Aviation base of Bom Sucesso in Lisbon. The War prevented the good progress of the works and the base ended only to be inaugurated in 1952, as the "Sacadura Cabral" Naval Aviation Centre.

The inauguration of the base happened during the process of the creation of the independent Portuguese Air Force (PoAF) and the transference of the Naval Aviation from the control of the Navy to the new branch.

On March 3, 1953, the Naval Aviation Centre was officially re-designated as Air Base No. 6. However, within the PoAF an independent group originating from the Naval Aviation units, known as "Forças Aeronavais", continued to operate from BA6 in the anti-submarine role. Only by late 1956, early 1957, was the integration of these units in the PoAF complete, with some personnel returning to the Navy and others staying in the air force.

In 1993, with the arrival of the Portuguese Navy's first Westland Super Lynx Mk.95 for the Vasco da Gama-class frigates, the air base became home to a naval helicopter squadron.

The Air Force Survival Training Center (Portuguese: Centro de Treino de Sobrevivência da Força Aérea, CTSFA) is based at BA6 with the mission of training PoAF personnel in survival and individual rescue, including in nuclear, radiologic, biological or chemical warfare environments, as well Explosive Ordnance Disposal.

In 2018 it was announced that the base would also become a civil airport (serving Lisbon) for low cost carriers by 2022.

== Tenant units ==
- Portuguese Air Force
  - 501 Sqn. "Bisontes" (Bisons) — tactical transport squadron
  - 502 Sqn. "Elefantes" (Elephants) — tactical and general transport squadron
  - 504 Sqn. "Linces" (Lynxes) — VIP and MEDEVAC transport squadron
  - 751 Sqn. "Pumas" (Pumas) — search and rescue squadron
- Portuguese Navy
  - Esquadrilha de Helicópteros da Marinha (Navy Helicopter Squadron)

== See also ==
- List of airports in Portugal
- Portuguese Air Force
- Portuguese Naval Aviation
- Field Firing Range of Alcochete
