= 711 Squadron (Portugal) =

- Esquadra 711
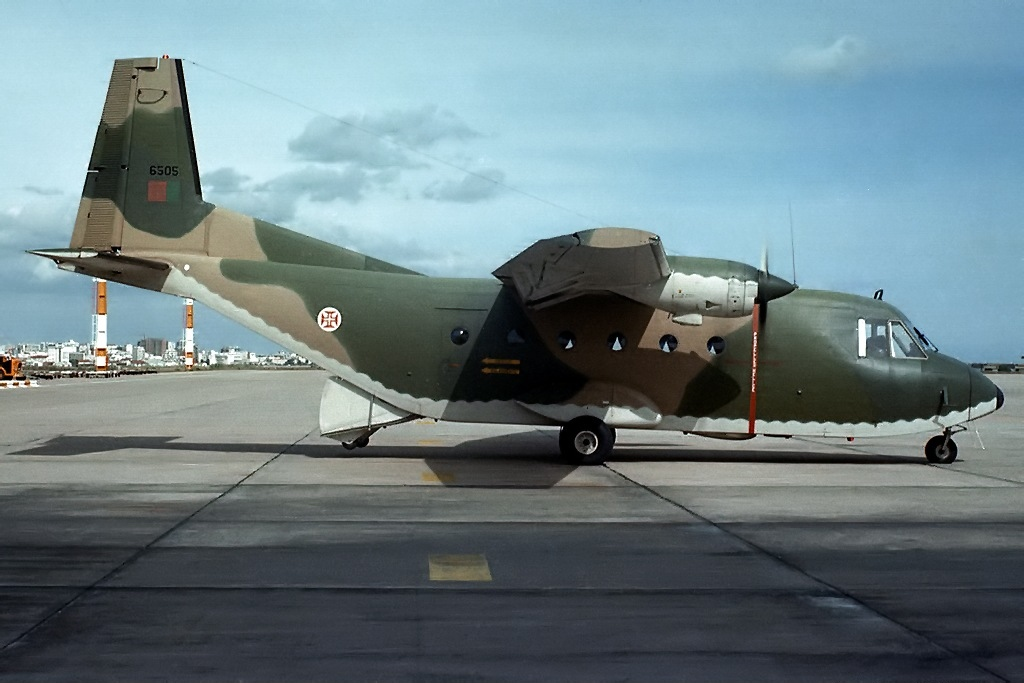
- Former Portuguese Air Force CASA C-212-100 Aviocar
- Active: October 19, 1993
- Disbanded: April 11, 2007
- Country: Portugal
- Branch: Air Force
- Role: Search and rescue
- Home Base: Air Base 4
- Nickname: Albatrozes (Albatrosses)
- Motto: "Para que outros vivam" (So that others may live)
- Decorations: Order of Prince Henry

Commanders
- Commander: Major Joaquim Simões Gaspar (2005–2007)

Aircraft flown
- Helicopter: Aérospatiale SA 330 Puma (1993–2006)
- Patrol: CASA C-212 Aviocar (1993–2007)
- Transport: CASA C-212 Aviocar (1993–2007)

The 711 Squadron "Albatrozes" (Esquadra 711) was a flying squadron of the Portuguese Air Force. Its primary mission was Search and Rescue and it has had secondary missions tactical air transport and general air transport in the Azores archipelago. During the time it was active it was the only operational squadron in the Portuguese military to operate both rotary- and fixed-wing aircraft.

== History ==
The origin of 711 Squadron dates back to the first search and rescue squadron (41 Squadron) of the Portuguese Air Force based at Lajes Air Base (Portuguese: Base Aérea Nº 6, BA6), in Azores, which operated SB-17G Flying Fortress, C-54 Skymaster, Grumman HU-16 Albatross, and Sikorsky H-19. In 1976 two new squadrons were created to replace 41 Squadron: 503 Squadron "Golfinhos", designated then has Maritime Patrol and Transport Squadron (Portuguese: Esquadra de Transporte e Patrulhamento Marítimo), equipped with CASA C-212-100 Aviocar aircraft, and No. 42 Search and Rescue Squadron (Portuguese: Esquadra de Busca e Salvamento nº 42), later renamed 752 Squadron "Pumas", operating Aérospatiale SA 330 Puma helicopters. On October 19, 1993, with the merger of these two squadrons, 711 Squadron was activated.

In addition to its primary search and rescue mission, the squadron executed transport and medical evacuations between the islands of the archipelago. This missions resulted in 13,300 flights, 34,000 transported passengers, 700 tons of cargo and 2,759 lives saved in search and rescue operations, 20,095 medical evacuations during 24,038 flying hours. Since 1994, the squadron also supported the medical evacuation of pregnant women from islands without proper medical facilities to the archipelago's hospitals, which marked during its operational history 6 births aboard the Aviocar and 12 births aboard the Puma.

With a reorganization in the operation structure of the Air Force in Azores, the helicopter flight of the squadron was deactivated on November 30, 2006, and was replaced by a detachment of 752 Squadron. Later, on April 11, 2007, the whole squadron was temporarily deactivated and the missions executed by its fixed-wing aircraft were taken over by a detachment of 502 Squadron. This temporary deactivation was due to the entry in service of the AgustaWestland EH-101 and EADS CASA C-295 that were to replace the SA 330 Puma and C-212 Aviocar, respectively. Its objective was for two years to gain experience and test through the squadrons' detachments new concepts in maintenance for the aircraft to enter service.

In 2008 the deactivation was made final and the squadron was disbanded and the 502 and 751 Squadrons detachments, part of the Azores Air Detachment (Portuguese: Destacamento Aéreo dos Açores, DAA) were made permanent.

== See also ==
- Portuguese Air Force
- Lajes Air Base
- 502 Squadron
- 503 Squadron
- 751 Squadron
- 752 Squadron
- Azores Air Zone Command
