= Lajes Field =

Portuguese Air Force base in the Azores

Lajes Field Air Base No. 4
- Base Aérea das Lajes; Base Aérea n.º 4
- Lajes, Terceira Island in the Azores
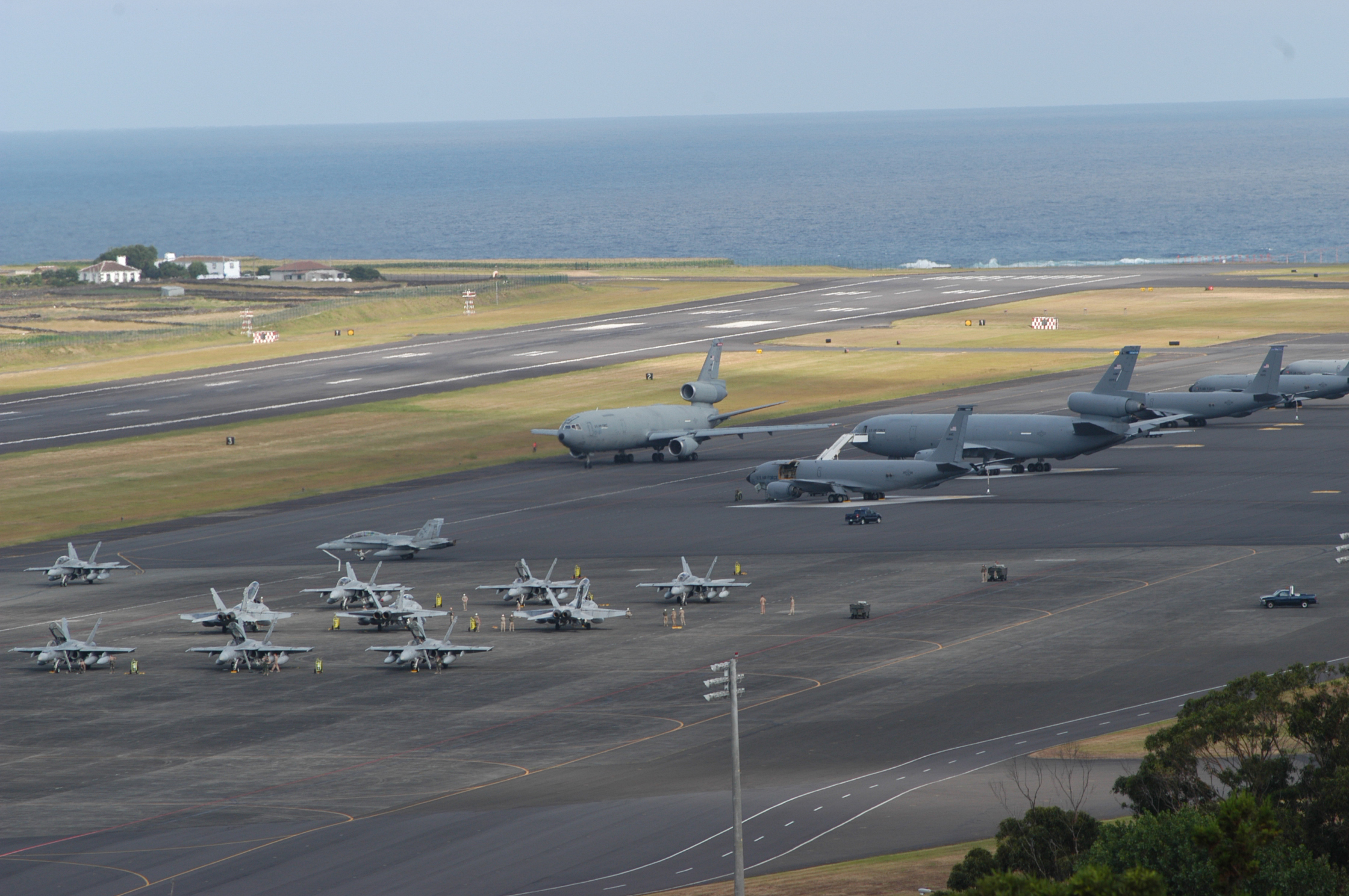
- US Air Force and US Navy aircraft at Lajes, while transiting between the Americas and Europe

- Nós outros, cuja fama tanto voa

Site information
- Type: Military airfield
- Owner: Ministry of National Defence
- Operator: Portuguese Air Force (PAF)
- Controlled by: Azores Air Zone Command
- Condition: Operational
- Website: Official website

Location
- Location in the Azores
- Coordinates: 38°45′43″N 027°05′27″W

Site history
- Built: 1934
- In use: 1934 – present

Garrison information
- Occupants: 502 Squadron (Portugal) (PAF); 752 Squadron "Fénix"(Portugal) (PAF); 65th Air Base Group (USAF)

Airfield information
- Identifiers: IATA: TER, ICAO: LPLA, WMO: 085090
- Elevation: 55 metres (180 ft) AMSL
Runways
| Direction | Length and surface |
|---|---|
| 15/33 | 3,314 metres (10,873 ft) Asphalt |
- Airfield shared with Lajes Airport; Source: Portuguese AIP

Lajes Field or Lajes Air Base (pronounced [ˈlaʒɨʃ]; Portuguese: Base Aérea das Lajes), officially designated Air Base No. 4 (Base Aérea n.º 4, BA4) (IATA: TER, ICAO: LPLA), is a multi-use airfield near Lajes and 15 km (9.3 mi) northeast of Angra do Heroísmo on Terceira Island in the Azores, Portugal. Located about 3,680 km (2,290 mi) east of New York City and about 1,600 km (990 mi) west of Lisbon, Portugal, the base sits in a strategic location midway between North America and Europe in the north Atlantic Ocean.

It is home to the Portuguese Air Force Base Aérea n.º 4 and Azores Air Zone Command (Portuguese: Comando da Zona Aérea dos Açores), a United States Air Force detachment unit (operated by the 65th Air Base Group of United States Air Forces in Europe - Air Forces Africa), and a regional air passenger terminal.

== History ==
The origin of the Lajes Field dates back to 1928, when Portuguese Army Lieutenant Colonel Eduardo Gomes da Silva wrote a report on the possible construction of an airfield in the plainland of Lajes, for that branch's aviation service (Portuguese: Aeronáutica Militar). The location of Achada on the center of Terceira Island was chosen instead. In 1934, the Achada airfield was condemned due to its inadequate dimensions and adverse weather conditions, resulting in the construction of a landing strip of packed earth and a small group of support facilities by the Portuguese military at Lajes.

=== World War II ===
During World War II, in order to defend Portuguese neutrality and deter both Nazi Germany and the Allies against a possible invasion of the Azores, the Portuguese Government significantly increased the garrisons of the isles, by mobilizing local forces and by sending about 28,000 troops and equipment from Mainland Portugal. As part of the defenses of Terceira Island, Lajes Field received a squadron of Gloster Gladiator fighters, having its runway expanded and becoming officially the Air Base No. 4.

In 1942, the military activities in the Azores grew, as the Gladiators began to be used to support allied convoys, in reconnaissance missions and on meteorological flights. A number of Junkers Ju 52, of the Portuguese Bomber Squadron sent to the Azores in 1941, deployed to Lajes in July 1942, to fly cargo missions.

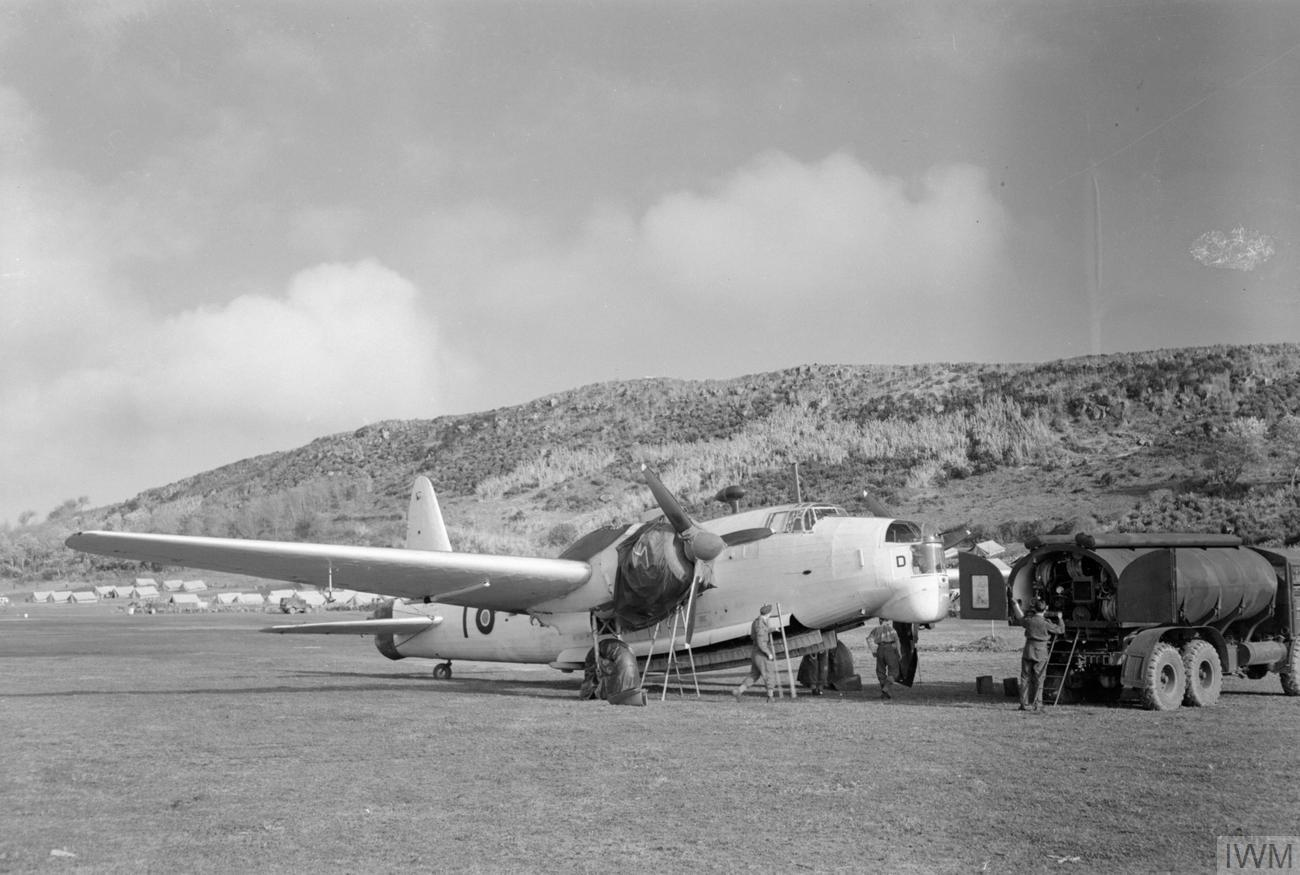
A Vickers Wellington Mk XIV, No. 172 Squadron RAF undergoing servicing at Lajes airfield during 1944

The Portuguese Government kept a collaborating neutrality towards the Allies and by 1943, the British and American armed forces were allowed basing rights in Portugal. Within a month of disembarking on Terceira in October 1943, the Royal Air Force (RAF) had laid pierced steel planking to lengthen the runway at Lajes Field, allowing the RAF to begin patrols. The first attack on a German U-boat was conducted in November, sinking the submarine; this attack was followed by a dozen more attacks on U-boats by the end of February 1944, after which German forces stayed clear of the British and American patrol areas. The Azores enabled British and American airmen to protect Allied shipping in the area.

On 1 December 1943, British and U.S. military representatives at RAF Lajes Field signed a joint agreement outlining the roles and responsibilities for the United States Army Air Forces (USAAF) and United States Navy (USN) at Lajes Field. The agreement established guidelines and limitations for the ferrying of aircraft to Europe via Lajes Field. In return, the US agreed to assist the British in improving and extending existing facilities at Lajes. Air Transport Command transport planes began landing at Lajes Field immediately after the agreement was signed. By the end of June 1944, more than 1,900 American airplanes had passed through the base. Using Lajes, the flying time relative to the usual transatlantic route between Brazil and West Africa was nearly cut in half from 70 to 40 hours.

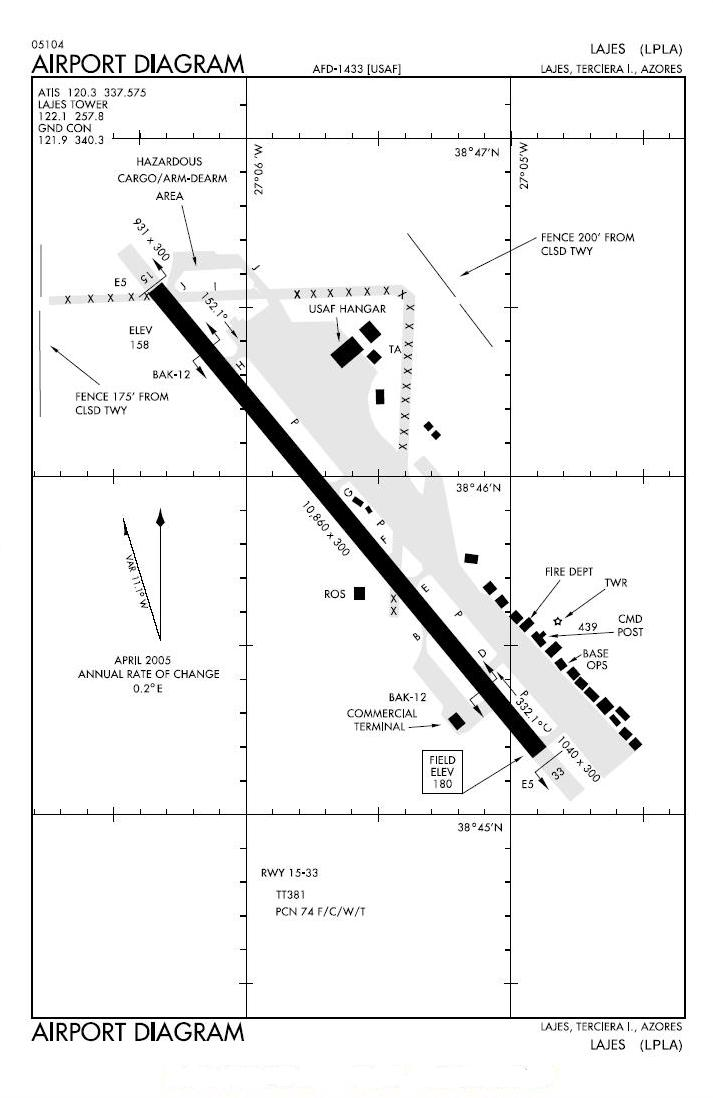
A diagram of Lajes Air Base

Lajes Field was one of the two stopover and refueling bases for the first transatlantic crossing of non-rigid airships (blimps) in 1944. The USN sent six Goodyear-built K-ships from Naval Air Station South Weymouth in Massachusetts to their first stopover base at Naval Station Argentia, Newfoundland and then on to Lajes Field in the Azores before flying to their final destination at Port Lyautey (Kenitra), French Morocco.

From their base with Fleet Air Wing 15 at Port Lyautey, the blimps of USN Blimp Squadron 14 (ZP-14 or Blimpron 14) conducted night-time anti-submarine warfare (ASW) to search for German U-boats around the Strait of Gibraltar using magnetic anomaly detection (MAD). In 1945, two ZP-14 replacement blimps were sent from Weeksville, North Carolina, to the Bermudas and Lajes before going on to Craw Field (Kenitra Air Base) at Port Lyautey.

=== Post-war ===
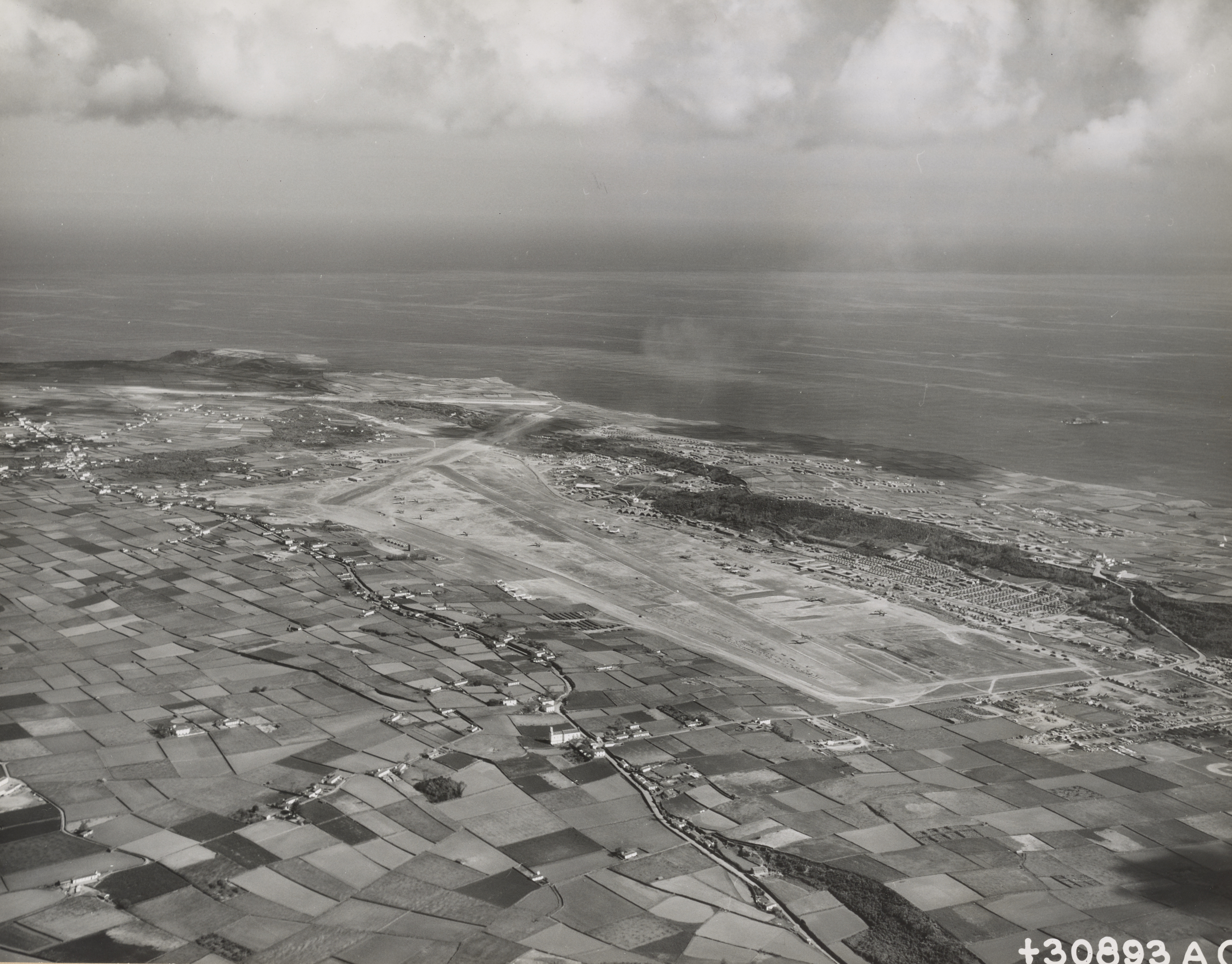
An aerial view of Lajes Field, 1946

The United States and the United Kingdom transferred control of Lajes back to Portugal in 1946. The Portuguese redesignated Lajes as Air Base No. 4 and assigned it to the air branch of the Portuguese Army. However, talks between the U.S. and Portugal began about extending the American stay in the Azores. A temporary agreement was reached between the U.S. and Portuguese governments giving the U.S. military rights to Lajes Field for an additional 18 months: the relationship between the Portuguese and American governments continues to this day, where the U.S. military resides under a tenancy status, and the Portuguese government retaining rights of ownership to the land and infrastructure. Lajes Field remains Portuguese Air Base 4 under the direction of Headquarters Azores Air Zone commanded by Portuguese Air Force brigadeiro (equal to a U.S. two-star general).

In 1947, the Portuguese Search and Rescue Squadron 41 (Esquadra 41) started to operate from Lajes, equipped with Boeing SB-17, Grumman HU-16 Albatross, Douglas C-54 Skymaster and, later Sikorsky H-19 helicopters. In 1952, the U.S. Air Force activated the 57th Air Rescue Squadron at Lajes Field, where it was based until inactivated in 1972. These units were responsible for the search and rescue (SAR) operations in the Atlantic between Europe and North America.

In 1949, the North Atlantic Treaty Organization (NATO) military alliance was established. Portugal, the United States, the United Kingdom, Canada, and other western European countries were charter members of NATO. By reason of the NATO alliance, Lajes was available for use by those countries, and the use of Lajes was one of Portugal's primary contributions to the alliance. However, use of Lajes Field by the U.S. Department of Defense takes place under a U.S.-Portuguese Status of Forces Agreement (SOFA), separate and in addition to NATO arrangements.

In 1953, Admiral Lynde D. McCormick, the Commander-in-Chief, United States Atlantic Command organized a subordinate unified command in the Azores called U.S. Forces Azores (USFORAZ). A small staff of United States Army, United States Air Force, and United States Marine Corps personnel composed the joint staff of USFORAZ, serving as the liaison between the U.S. and the Portuguese in the Azores.

In the late 1950s, USAF air refueling/tanker aircraft were stationed at Lajes to provide inflight refueling for U.S. aircraft transiting the Atlantic Ocean. Some of the tanker units left Lajes by 1965, but others returned later, especially the USAF Boeing KC-135 Stratotanker. This transfer, coupled with the introduction of newer long-range aircraft, resulted in a gradual decline in Lajes traffic. The Military Air Transport Service (MATS) and its successor, the Military Airlift Command (MAC), became responsible for USAF activities at the base, and for a while the 1605th Military Airlift Support Wing acted as USAF host unit.

Lajes Field also played a crucial role in Cold War politics. From 1932 to 1968, Portugal was under the authoritarian regime of António de Oliveira Salazar, yet the U.S. Government maintained friendly relations with his Estado Novo government, especially after 1943. The Cold War military importance of Lajes Field outweighed considerations about the Salazar Government's authoritarian rule over Portugal.

In 1961, the Portuguese Air Force Heavy Aircraft Advanced Training Squadron 42 (Esquadra 42 - EICAP) was transferred to Lajes, operating Douglas C-47, Douglas C-54 and later CASA C-212 Aviocar.

During the Portuguese Overseas War, from 1961 to 1975, the Air Force Hospital at Lajes operated as the main centre for treatment and rehabilitation of mutilated and heavy burned soldiers of the three services of the Portuguese Armed Forces.

In December, 13th and 14th, 1971, Lajes Field hosts the Atlantic Summit between U.S. President Richard Nixon, French President Georges Pompidou and Portuguese prime-minister Marcelo Caetano.

During the 1973 Yom Kippur War, Lajes Field also supported Operation Nickel Grass, the U.S. airlift missions to Israel, highlighting the importance of the U.S. Air Force base at Lajes.

Another important Cold War operation at Lajes was the U.S. Navy's Naval Air Facility Lajes (NAF Lajes), a tenant activity at the air base. NAF Lajes, and its associated Tactical Support Center (TSC)/Antisubmarine Warfare Operations Center (ASWOC), supported rotational detachments of U.S. Navy P-2 Neptune and later P-3 Orion maritime patrol aircraft that would track Soviet attack, guided missile, and ballistic missile submarines in the region. With the collapse of the Soviet Union and the Warsaw Pact, and end of the Cold War, P-3 operations at Lajes declined, and the Naval Air Facility was inactivated in the late 1990s.

=== Post-Carnation Revolution ===
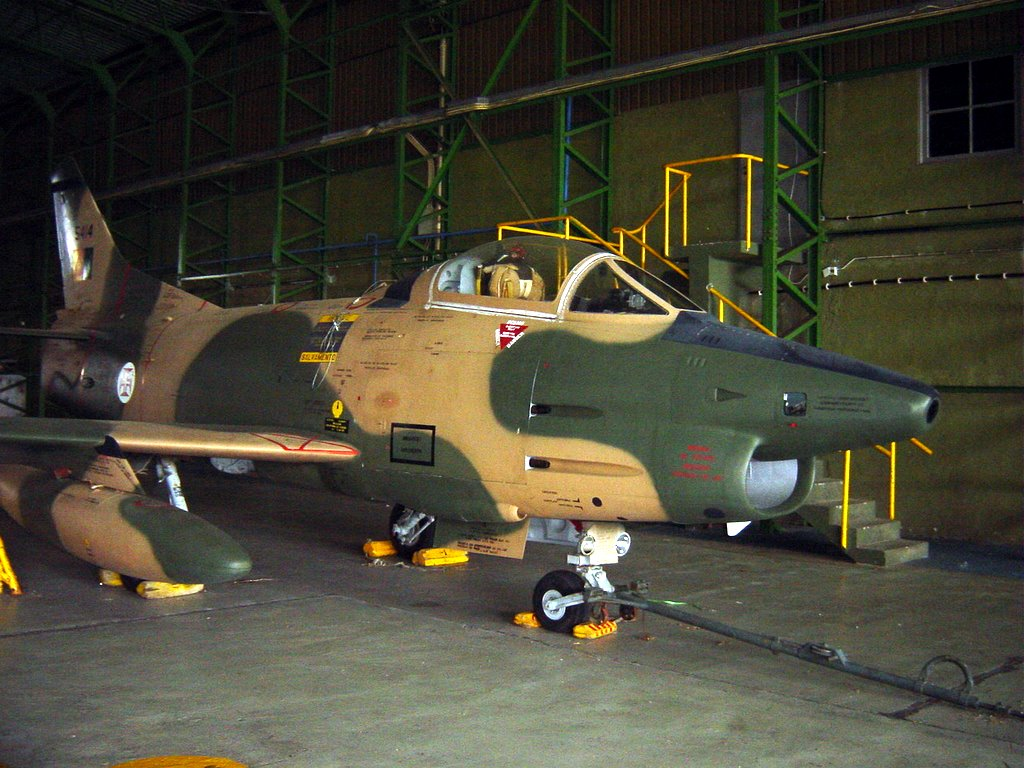
A Portuguese Air Force Fiat G.91 fighter-bomber in its hangar at Lajes, 1980s

Following the Portuguese Air Force reorganization of 1978, Lajes Air Base comes to have two resident flying units: Transport Squadron 503 (Esquadra 503) - equipped with CASA C-212 aircraft and Helicopter Search and Rescue Squadron 752 (Esquadra 752) - equipped with Aérospatiale SA 330 Puma helicopters. In 1980, a detachment of Attack Squadron 301 (Esquadra 301) - equipped with Fiat G.91 fighter-bombers - starts to be based at Lajes, this being augmented and becoming the Attack Squadron 303 "Jaguars" (Esquadra 302, "Jaguares") in 1981.

The M_{w} 7.2 Azores Islands earthquake affected Terceira Island. Damage to Lajes Field was minimal, but Portuguese communities throughout the island suffered extensive damage. Military personnel responded with food, shelter, equipment, and manpower.

In the summer of 1984, Lajes undertook a new mission known as "SILK PURSE." Boeing EC-135s began operating out of Lajes Field as an airborne command post for the U.S. Commander-in-Chief, Europe. Along with the aircraft came the U.S. European Command battle staff and flight crews from United States Air Forces in Europe. This mission was ended in late August 1991.

In 1990, Squadron 303 was disbanded.

Lajes supported the large airlift during the Gulf War. On the first day of the deployment over 90 aircraft transited Lajes. Strategic Air Command (SAC) created a provisional tanker wing, the 802nd Air Refueling Wing (P) Provisional, at Lajes to support the airlift. At the height of the operation a peak of 33 tanker aircraft and 600 troops deployed to Lajes. Soon after the Gulf War ended, Lajes command changed from Air Mobility Command, to Air Combat Command.

In 1993, squadrons 503 and 752 are merged in a single mixed unit operating both C-212 and Aérospatiale Puma, the 711 Squadron Albatrosses (Esquadra 711 "Albatrozes").

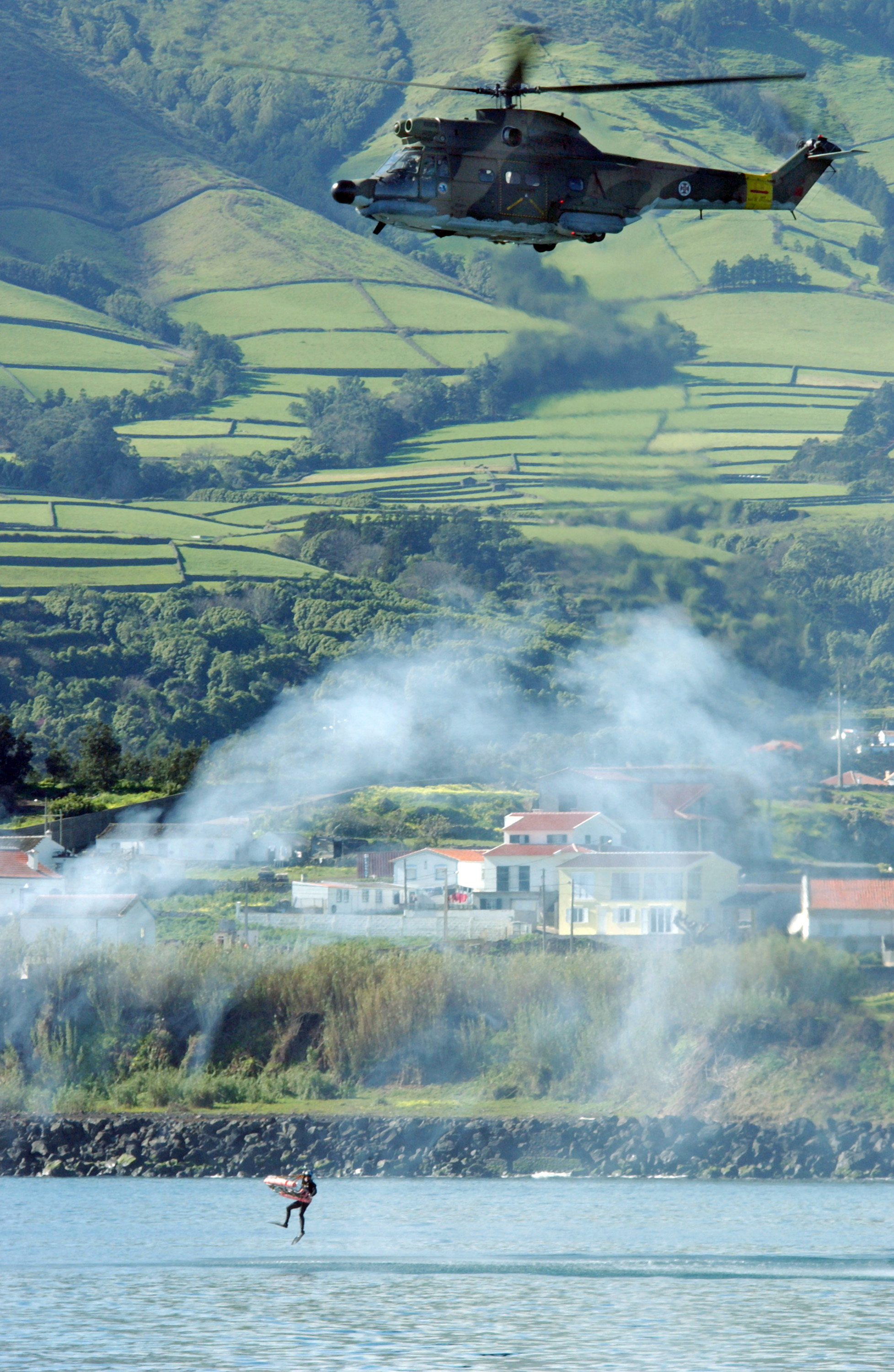
A SA 330 Puma helicopter from Squadron 711, Lajes supports a Space Shuttle Recovery Exercise at Azores in 2004.

The resident Portuguese 711 Squadron was deactivated on 30 November 2006. With this act the long-serving Aerospatiale Puma was retired from service. The Puma helicopters were replaced by the modern AgustaWestland AW101 Merlin: the Portuguese government purchased twelve units for SAR, CSAR and Fisheries enforcement. Air Base No. 4 received three Merlins on permanent detachment from Esquadra 751 "Pumas" from Air Base No. 6 at Montijo, near Lisbon. They saw immediate service starting 1 December 2006.

Maintenance problems developed in following months, coupled with a shortage of spare parts from the manufacturer, leading to such a low serviceable rate, forcing the Portuguese Air Force to pull the Merlin from service in the Azores. The last Merlin flew back to Montijo in March 2009. In order not to compromise the SAR mission, the Portuguese Air Force decided to reactivate the Puma fleet: in July 2008 a formation of four Puma helicopters made the trans-Atlantic crossing from Beja to Lajes via Porto Santo Airport on Porto Santo Island and Santa Maria Airport on Santa Maria Island.

Beginning in 1997, large scale fighter aircraft movements under the new USAF operating concept known as the Air Expeditionary Force (AEF) filled the Lajes flightline. Lajes also has hosted B-52 Stratofortress and B-1 Lancer bomber aircraft on global air missions, and also supported many routine NATO exercises, such as the biennial Northern Viking exercise. Lajes Field services aircraft from various nations, including Belgium, Brazil, Canada, Colombia, Denmark, France, Germany, Greece, India, Israel, Italy, the Netherlands, Pakistan, Poland, Qatar, Russia, Spain, Sweden, the United Kingdom, and Venezuela. The airfield was an alternative landing site for the NASA Space Shuttle orbiter and also now acts as the number one diversion airport for medical or mechanical emergency diversion situations for all types of aircraft. An annual average of 50 aircraft of all types divert to Lajes as a mid Atlantic safe haven.

=== 2000 – present ===
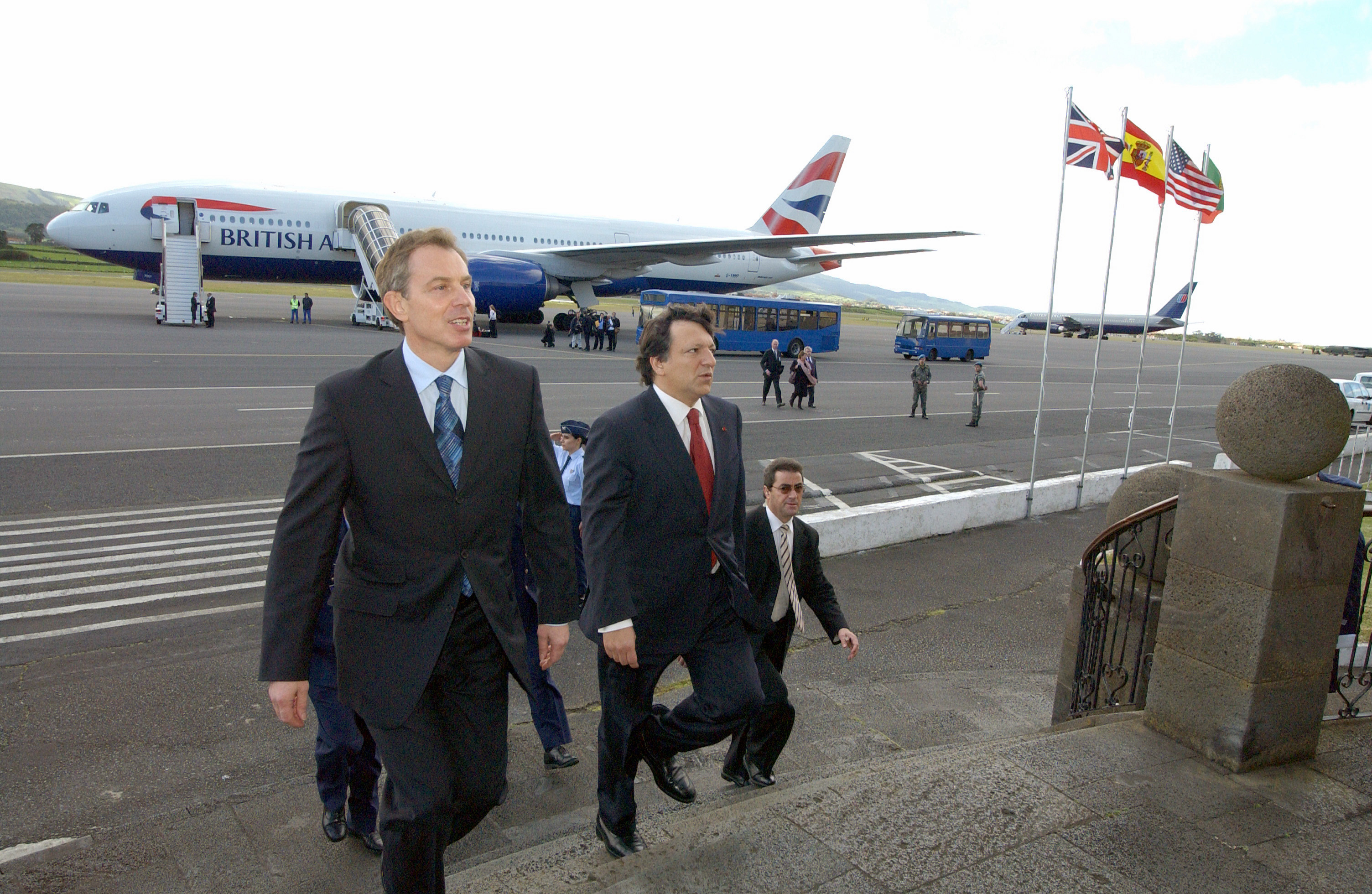
British Prime Minister Tony Blair and Portuguese Prime Minister José Manuel Durão Barroso at Lajes Airfield, March 2003.

In 2009 Lajes provided rescue support of shipping lanes across the Atlantic, a safe haven for medical or mechanical emergency situations in aircraft crossing the Atlantic, and support for the USAF's continuing campaigns in Iraq and Afghanistan. Fighter, tanker and transport planes frequently stopped there, either east or westbound. The next decade expects to see a rise in the number of U.S. Department of Defense aircraft to transit Lajes supporting the newly created AFRICOM.

In August 2006, Portuguese news agencies reported that both governments were in discussions for a new agreement that could allow the use of Lajes for the training of a permanent F-22 Raptor squadron. Since 1943, the use of Lajes by the U.S. military has allowed Portugal to strengthen diplomatic relations with the U.S. as well as obtain military equipment for the Portuguese Armed Forces, including two A-7P Corsair II squadrons and the co-finance of F-16 Fighting Falcon aircraft under the Peace Atlantis I program.

In August 2010, Portuguese news agencies advised for the termination of the F-22 Raptor plan to use Lajes as a platform for Dissimilar Air Combat Training (DACT) training over the Atlantic Ocean. DoD sources were cited as the plan cancelled due to budgetary constraints. This was regarded locally as a setback for the military environment at Lajes, as well as raising doubts from regional political forces who have concerns regarding the base future as well as the safety of the Azorean employed workforce.

Portugal has explored contingencies in the event the United States military eventually abandons Lajes, including the possibility of entering an agreement with the People's Republic of China. On June 27, 2012, an airplane carrying Premier Wen Jiabao made a four-hour stop at Lajes during which time he toured the island.

On 13 December 2012, the US Department of Defense announced, as part of a larger Air Force effort to shape the force, that Lajes Field will transition from an air base wing to an air base group with a reduction of more than 400 military personnel and 500 family members by the end of fiscal year 2014. This force reduction is estimated to garner a cost savings of $35 million annually.

=== 2026 Iran war ===
Lajes Air Base was used by the United States Armed Forces as a logistical support point during military operations against Iran in 2026. Located in the Azores, the base has a strategic position in the Atlantic that facilitates the movement of aircraft between the United States and the Middle East. In this context, several military aircraft passed through the base for refueling, maintenance, and preparation before continuing their journey to other regions where operations were taking place. The use of the base did not mean that bombings were launched directly from Lajes, but rather that the infrastructure served as an essential intermediate point to support American air missions. This type of cooperation is possible due to the defense agreement between Portugal and the United States, which allows the use of the base in certain military operations.

== Role and operations ==
=== Transit stop ===
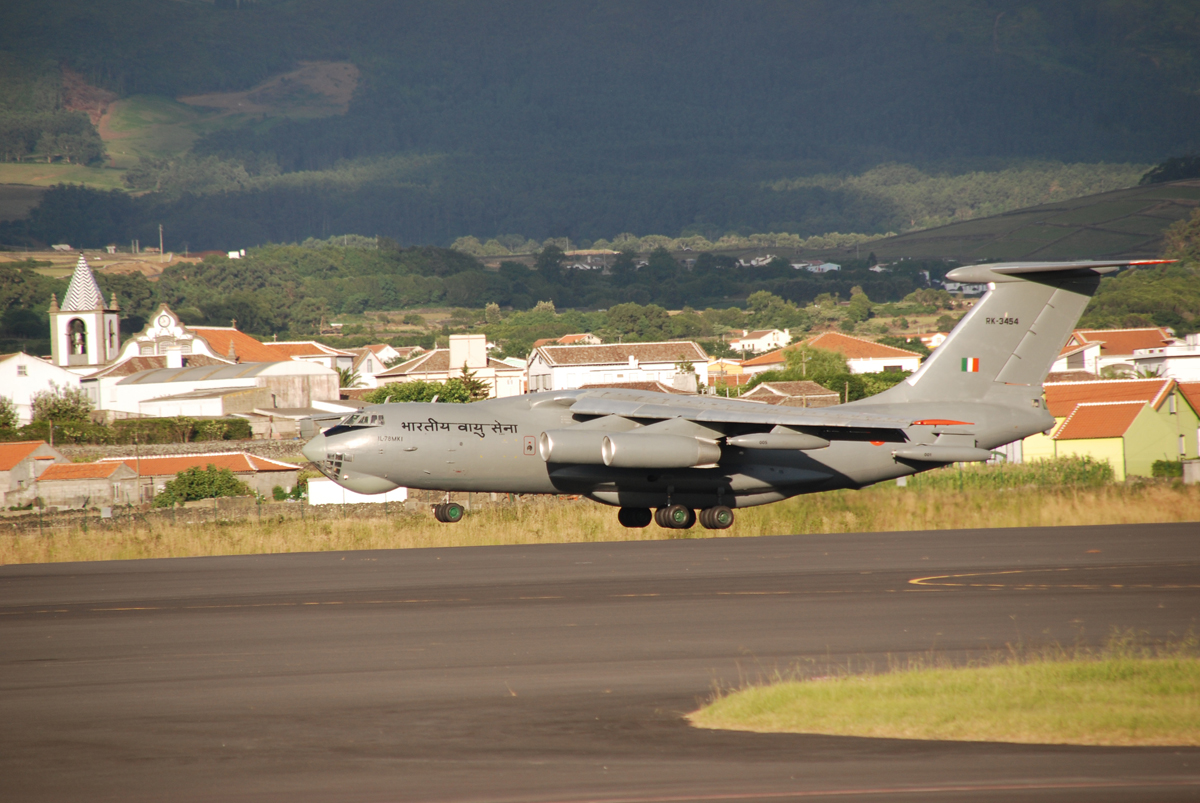
An Indian Air Force Il-78MKI landing at Lajes Field

The base supports NATO and non-NATO armed forces assets crossing the Atlantic for transport, VIP, exercise, relief or humanitarian duties.

The civilian terminal also plays an important role in support of passenger and cargo airliners, executive, corporate and private jets flying to the island or beyond as the central location in the Azores group of islands makes it an ideal spot for refuelling or stopover. In the past five years, large Antonov An-124 and An-225 aircraft have been seen frequently transporting outsized cargo for destinations in North and South America.

Lajes provides support to 15,000 aircraft, including fighters from the US and 20 other allied nations. The geographic position has made this airbase strategically important to both the United States and NATO's war fighting capability. A small commercial aviation terminal handles scheduled and chartered flights from North America and Europe, especially mainland Portugal. It also supervises commercial air traffic with the other islands in the Azorean archipelago and trans-Atlantic refuelling and stopovers for commercial airlines, executive and corporate jets, air cargo haulers, small private aircraft, governmental flights, humanitarian missions, and other flights.

=== Portuguese Air Force ===
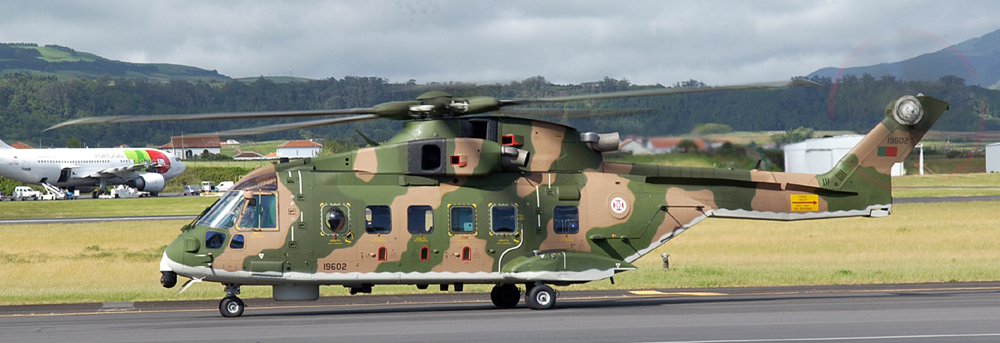
A Portuguese Air Force AW101 at Lajes.

Air Base No 4 (Lajes Air Base) is a base unit of the Portuguese Air Force, subordinated to the Azores Air Zone Command. Presently, Lajes Air Base is the home of the Squadron 752 "Fénix", a search and rescue squadron flying the AgustaWestland AW101 helicopters, which undertakes the SAR and air evacuation mission within the Santa Maria FIR - Flight Information Region. Lajes is also home of a permanent detachment of Squadron 502 "Elefantes", flying one EADS CASA C-295M deployed from Montijo Air Base, with tactical and general transport, medical evacuation, maritime patrol and search and rescue support duties. Other Portuguese Air Force aircraft are also occasionally deployed to Lajes, including Lockheed P-3C Orion from Maritime Patrol Squadron 601. The Azores Air Command headquarters is also installed in the base.

=== United States Air Force ===
Lajes Field is the home of the 65th Air Base Group, which in turn is subordinate to the United States Air Forces in Europe. The group provides base and en route support for the U.S. Department of Defense, NATO, and other authorized aircraft transiting the installation. Due to the global economic crisis, the US government decided to reduce the military contingent at Lajes to no more than 170 active duty personnel. Families will relocate stateside or elsewhere, several buildings, dorms and homes will be made redundant. This much reduced effective will still be responsible to keep Lajes operational mission active although at a much reduced scale, with relevant changes to be implemented from March 2014.

In addition to the 65th Air Base Wing, other units at Lajes Field include the U.S. Army Military Traffic Management Command's 1324th Military Port Command in the nearby port of Praia da Vitoria, U.S. Air Force Air Mobility Command’s 729th Air Mobility Support Squadron, Detachment 6 of the Air Force Public Affairs Agency, Detachment 250 - Air Force Office of Special Investigations, DLA Disposition Services, and the Defense Commissary Agency.

Lajes Field was the home of the 65th Communication Squadron, which provides communication in the form of High Frequency Global Communications Systems (HFGCS), ground radio, ground radar, SatCom (Satellite Communications), and cryptography to the base, until 2019 when an Air Base Squadron was activated and absorbed the 65th Operational Support Squadron, 65th Security Forces Squadron, and 65th Communication Squadron.

=== Civilian operations ===
Civilian operators may use Terceira Airport/Lajes Air Base after requesting a landing permit according to the rules inscribed in the AIP for Portugal, issued by the Portuguese Civil Aviation Authority (ANAC).

== Based units ==
Units based at Lajes Field.

Those marked GSU and their subordinate units are Geographically Separate Units, which although based at Lajes, report to a parent unit based at another location.

=== Portuguese Air Force ===
Air Command

- Azores Air Zone Command
  - Air Base No 4
    - Operational Group 41
      - Squadron 752 "Fénix"
      - Squadron 502 "Elefantes" Detachment
    - Air Base No 4 Support Group

=== United States Air Force ===
US Air Forces in Europe - Air Forces Africa (USAFE-AFAFRICA)

- Third Air Force
  - 86th Airlift Wing
    - 65th Air Base Group (GSU)
      - 65th Air Base Squadron
      - 65th Logistics Readiness Squadron
      - 765th Air Base Squadron

Air Mobility Command

  - 521st Air Mobility Operations Wing
    - 721st Air Mobility Operations Group
      - 721st Aerial Port Squadron – Operating Location Alpha (GSU)

== Accidents and incidents ==
- On January 31, 1951, a Douglas C-54 Skymaster operated by the Portuguese Air Force crashed into the sea while approaching Lajes Field, having taken off from Lisbon, Portugal, killing all 14 on board.
- On August 9, 1954, a Lockheed L-749A-79 Constellation operated by Avianca crashed three minutes after takeoff. It flew left into the hills instead of right towards the sea, killing all 30 on board.
- On October 10, 1956, a United States Navy Douglas R6D-1 Liftmaster transport on a Military Air Transport Service flight disappeared over the Atlantic Ocean during a flight from RAF Lakenheath, England, to Lajes Field with the loss of all 59 people on board.
- On September 3, 1976, a Venezuelan Air Force C-130 Hercules crashed while attempting an emergency landing during Hurricane Emmy. On final approach, a wind gust slammed the aircraft into a hillside, killing all 68 people aboard. Most of the passengers were members of the student chorus of the Central University of Venezuela in Caracas, traveling to Barcelona.
- On April 26, 1978, a United States Navy P-3 Orion ditched into the Atlantic Ocean while on approach approximately 20 miles away, after completing a training mission. Few debris were found floating on water and all seven crew members were killed. The crash happened under unknown circumstances.
- On February 4, 1998, an Antonov 12BP operated by Air Luxor crashed on takeoff when the number three engine shut down and feathered. The plane then veered right, stalled and crashed into a hill killing all 7 on board.
- On 24 August 2001, Air Transat Flight 236 – an Airbus A330 with 293 passengers and 13 crew members on board – en route to Lisbon from Toronto, Ontario, Canada, made an emergency landing at Lajes with no loss of life, after running out of fuel over the Atlantic and gliding about 120 km (75 mi).
- On 26 April 2017, British Airways Flight 2263, on the way from London-Gatwick to Kingston, Jamaica, made an unscheduled landing due to an argument between two passengers and cabin crew. The passengers had demanded to be moved from economy to first class. The flight continued after the passengers were made to disembark and were questioned by Portuguese police.
- On March 20, 2020, Aeromexico Flight 37, on its way from Mexico City, Mexico, to Barcelona, Spain, made an unscheduled emergency landing in Lajes. The pilot of the Boeing 787 Dreamliner declared an emergency due to a cracked windscreen in the cockpit.

== See also ==
- Aviation in the Azores
- Lajes War Cemetery
- North Atlantic air ferry route in World War II
- Portugal during World War I
- Portugal during World War II
- Satellite map images with missing or unclear data
