= 752 Squadron =

752 Squadron may refer to:

- 752 Squadron (Portugal)
- 752 Naval Air Squadron, Royal Navy
- 752nd Bombardment Squadron, United States Army Air Forces
- 752nd Radar Squadron, United States Air Force
