= Lajes War Cemetery =

Commonwealth War Graves Commission cemetery in Portugal

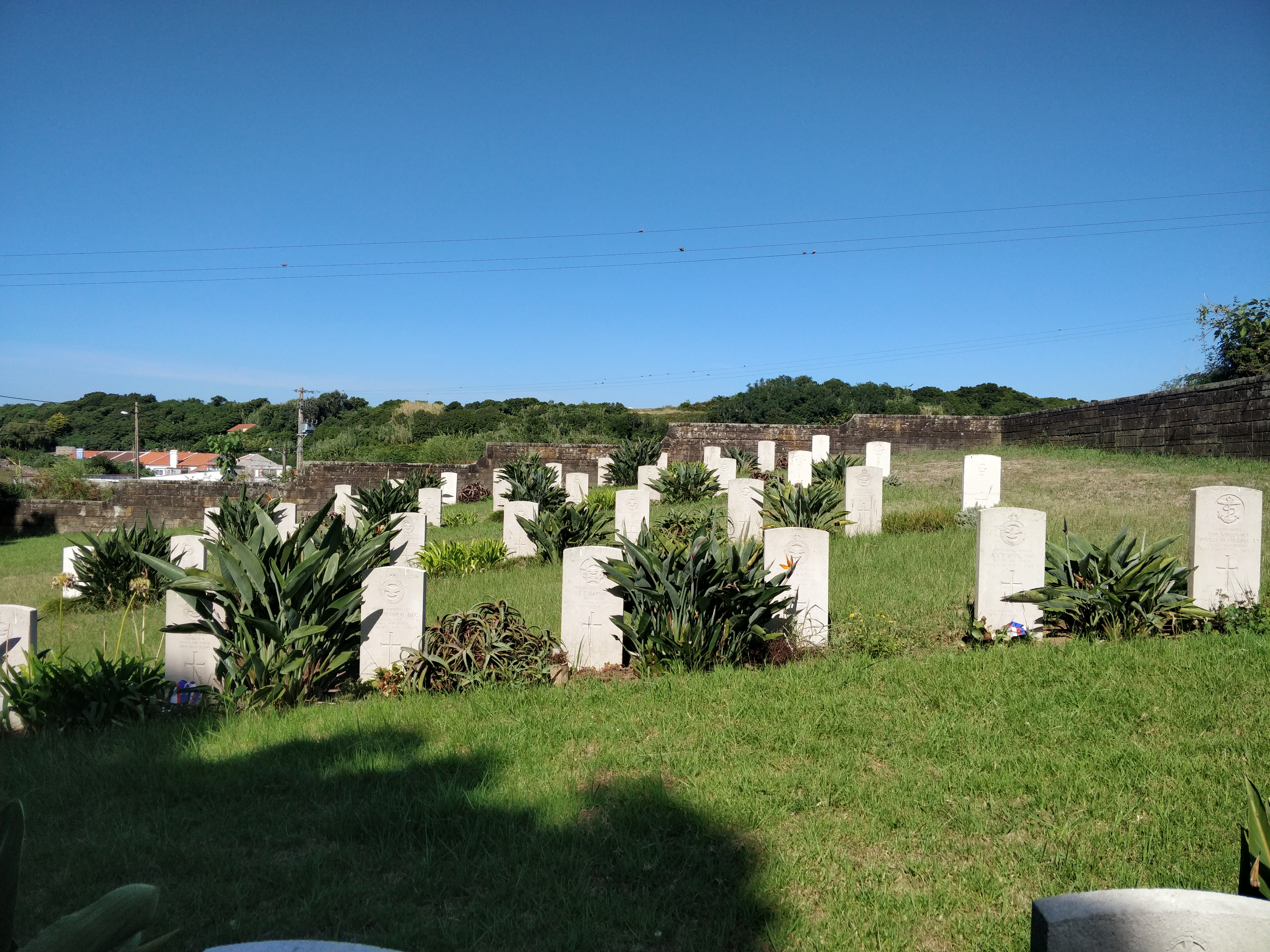
- Interactive map of Lajes War Cemetery

Details
- Established: 1943-44
- Location: Terceira Island, Azores,
- Country: Portugal
- Coordinates: 38°44′28″N 27°04′47″W
- Owned by: Commonwealth War Graves Commission
- No. of graves: 49
- Website: https://www.cwgc.org/visit-us/find-cemeteries-memorials/cemetery-details/2086504/lajes-war-cemetery/

The Lajes War Cemetery is a Commonwealth War Graves Commission (CWGC) cemetery on Terceira Island in the Azores archipelago of Portugal. It is situated a short distance from Lajes Airport, previously known as Lajes Field. Most of those buried there were British and Commonwealth airmen killed in flying accidents during World War II.

== Background ==
Portugal was officially neutral in World War II. In August 1943, the Portuguese dictator, António de Oliveira Salazar, suspecting that the Allies would win the war, agreed to provide access to Lajes Field for the Royal Air Force (RAF). He probably had little choice, as there were active Allied plans to seize the airfield, under the code name of Operation Alacrity. This access was mainly required by the Allies to facilitate the search for the German U-boats that had inflicted serious damage on the British merchant fleet. In total, the three British anti-submarine squadrons at Lajes sunk 53 U-boats, and the number of merchant ships lost declined rapidly. Shortly after the British moved in, an agreement was reached for the base to also be used by the United States Army Air Forces (USAAF) and United States Navy (USN), which significantly reduced the flying time between the US and Europe.

A British engineer died on 3 November 1943, which led the British authorities to request permission to bury their dead in the municipal cemetery of Terceira's capital of Angra do Heroísmo. This was initially agreed but, subsequently, the municipality decided to allocate a plot of land close to Lajes to serve as a war cemetery in perpetuity. It is locally known as the Cemitério dos Ingleses or the British Cemetery. At first, Americans were also buried there but later the bodies of Americans were returned to the US and those in the cemetery were reinterred in the United States. There were many fewer American fatalities than there were British and Commonwealth deaths.

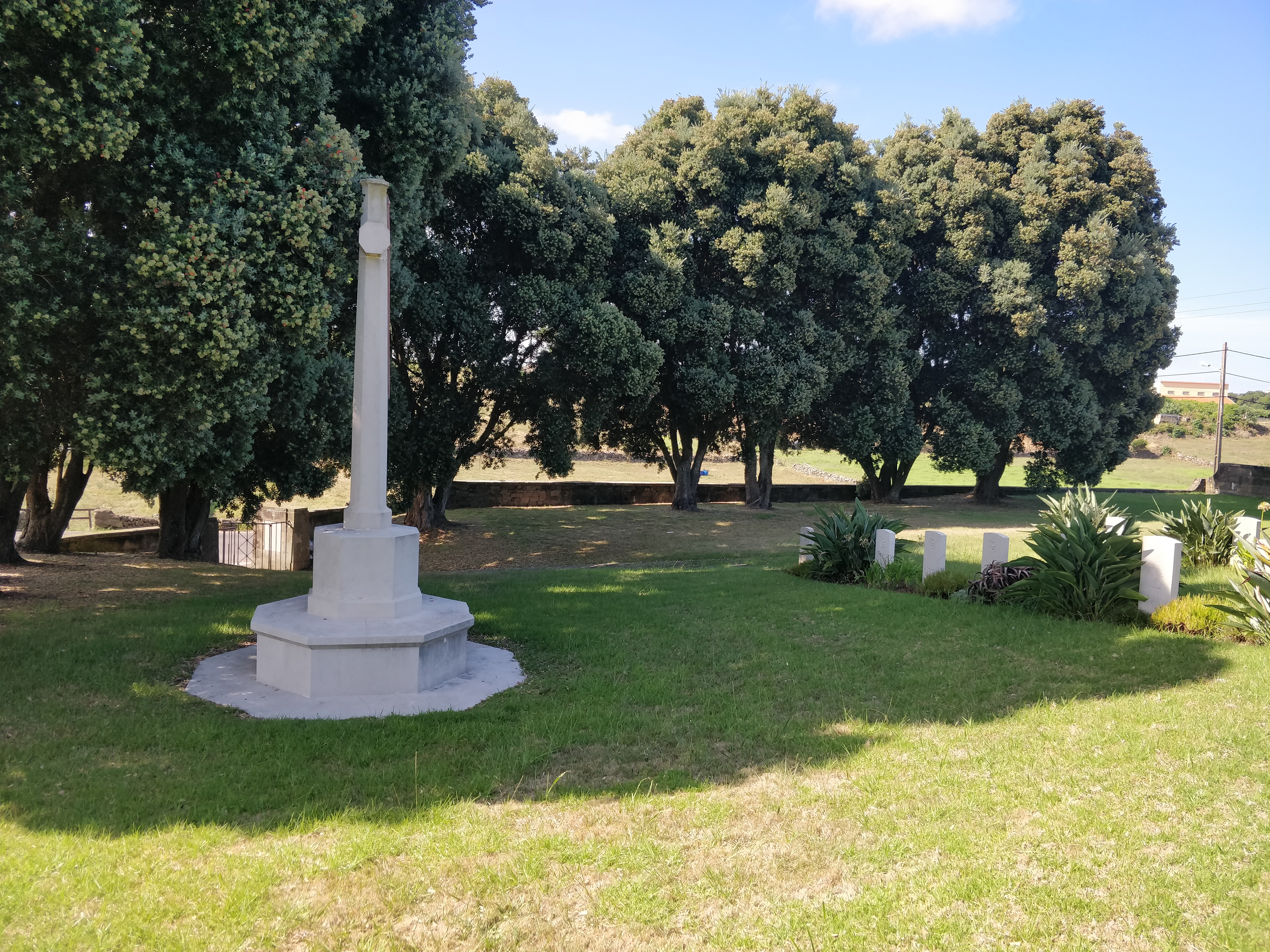

== The cemetery ==
Lajes cemetery is situated close to the Capela de Nossa Senhora de Fátima Catholic Church in the Praia da Vitória municipality. It is the only CWGC cemetery in Portugal, although there are Commonwealth War Graves to be found elsewhere in the country in other cemeteries, including at the British Cemetery in Lisbon. The cemetery contains 49 graves, of which 35 are of British servicemen, seven Canadian, three Czech, two Australian and one each from New Zealand and Poland. Most of those buried there were airmen or engineers but the Commander of HMS Hesperides, Charles Alexander Colville, 3rd Viscount Colville of Culross, is also buried there. HMS Hesperides was a land-based listening and repeating station. A member of the merchant navy was the only non-military burial. At the entrance to the cemetery, there is a plaque in English and Portuguese, stating that: "The land on which this cemetery stands is the gift of the Portuguese people for the perpetual resting place of the sailors, soldiers and airmen who are honoured here."

== Causes of death ==
Two of those buried in the cemetery died from natural causes. Three died while off-duty, one suffering from an excess of alcohol. Three others had accidents on the ground, with one being electrocuted, another hit by a propeller, and a third dying when two planes collided on the ground. However, most died from flying accidents:

- On 4 December 1943, an RAF Boeing B-17 Flying Fortress crashed into the sea two and a half miles north of the airfield, killing all onboard. Three of the eight British and Australian crew were buried at the cemetery. The others are remembered at the Commonwealth Air Forces Memorial at Runnymede in Surrey, England.
- On 13 December 1943, an RAF Lockheed Hudson was returning from an anti-submarine patrol when it flew into high ground five miles west of Lajes. The four crew members are buried at the cemetery.
- On 20 February 1945 an RAF De Havilland Mosquito fighter crashed during take-off, killing the Polish captain and British flying officer. Both are buried at the cemetery.
- On 8 March 1945, an RAF Consolidated B-24 Liberator was leaving Lajes to carry out an air-sea rescue. During take-off the outer starboard propeller touched the runway, causing the plane to crash. All eight crew on board were killed and all are buried at the cemetery.
- On 14 March 1945 another RAF Liberator, this time heading back to the UK with 19 on board, including Colville, crashed shortly after take-off. All are buried in the cemetery. There are conflicting versions of the cause of the crash.

== Present condition ==
The cemetery continues to be maintained by the Commonwealth War Graves Commission. It can be visited 24 hours a day.
