= 752 Squadron (Portugal) =

- Esquadra 752
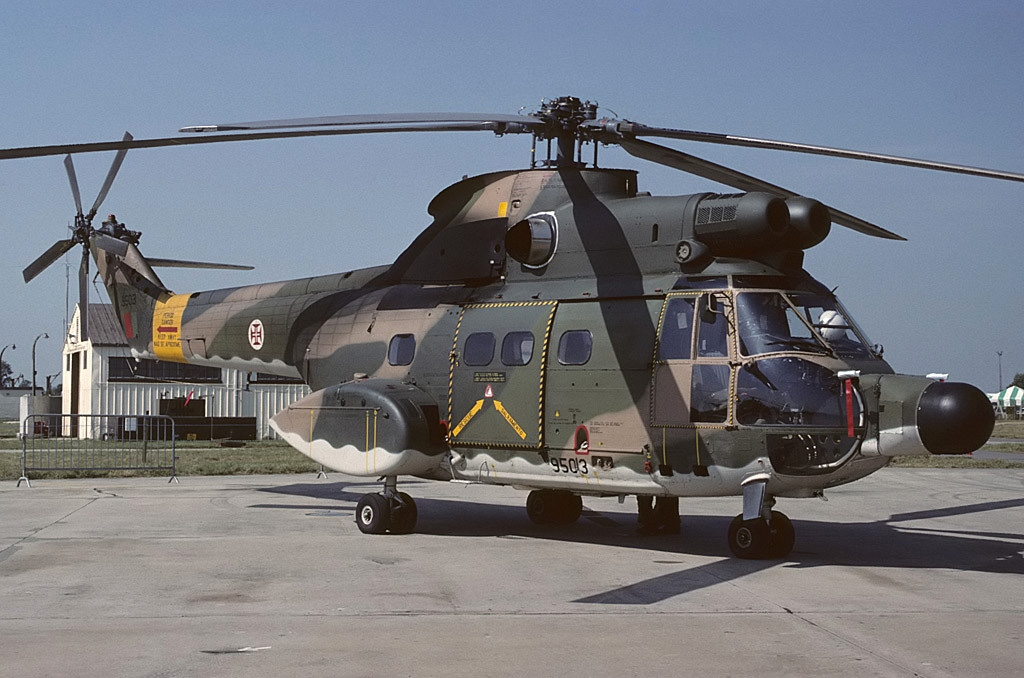
- Former Portuguese Air Force Aérospatiale SA 330
- Active: November 30, 1977 — October 1993; September 24, 2008 - April 5, 2011
- Country: Portugal
- Branch: Air Force
- Role: Search and rescue
- Home Base: Air Base 4
- Nickname: Pumas
- Motto: "Para que outros vivam" (So that others may live)

Aircraft flown
- Helicopter: Aérospatiale SA 330 Puma

The 752 Squadron "Fénix" (Esquadra 752) is a helicopter Search and Rescue squadron of the Portuguese Air Force, flying the EH101 Merlin helicopter.

== History ==
Activated on November 30, 1977, along with its sister 751 Squadron, the 752 Sqn. was the direct successor of the 42 Squadron, which had been activated in the beginning of that year and was later disbanded leading to the creation of the 752 Squadron.

In October 1993, the 752 Squadron was disbanded after the creation of the "Puma" Flight in the recently formed 711 Squadron.

In 2008, the entry in service of the AgustaWestland EH101 with the PoAF lead to changes in the operational structure of the branch in Azores. With this the Helicopter Flight of the 711 Squadron was deactivated and a detachment of the 751 Squadron replaced this flight in the Search and Rescue mission in Azores. However, due to complications in the logistical support provided by the manufacturer of the EH 101, the choice was made to reintroduce the SA 330 Puma into the medical evacuation operations to complement the 751 Squadron's detachment.

On September 24, 2008, the 752 Squadron is reactivated, at Lajes Air Base, to operate the Aérospatiale SA 330, beginning its operational mission on October 1. With this the 751 Sqn. will provide transport, medical evacuation, and search and rescue operations together with the EH 101 Merlin helicopters of the 751 Sqn, which will guarantee the long-range search and rescue. The 752 Squadron was disbanded April 5, 2011.

However, due to operational restructuring among the Portuguese Air Force, in May 16th 2023, by decree of the Portuguese Chief of Staff nº 38/2023, 752 squadron was reactivated at Air Base nº4, Lajes, Terceira island, Azores with approved nickname "Fénix", with Search And Rescue, Medical air Evacuation and General Transport missions, using the EH101 Merlin helicopter. With this renactment, the 751 Squadron detachment form Air Base nº6, Montijo, in mainland Portugal, was terminated.

== See also ==
- Portuguese Air Force
- Lajes Air Base
- 751 Squadron
- 503 Squadron
- 711 Squadron
