= High Frequency Global Communications System =

U.S. Air Force shortwave transmitter network

The High Frequency Global Communications System (HFGCS) is a network of single sideband shortwave transmitters of the United States Air Force which is used to communicate with aircraft in flight, ground stations and some United States Navy surface assets. All worldwide receiving and transmitting sites in the HFGCS system are remotely controlled from Andrews Air Force Base and Grand Forks Air Force Base. Before 1 October 2002 it was known as the Global High Frequency System (GHFS).

HFGCS stations tend to operate in the aviation bands clustered around 5, 6, 8 and 11/12 MHz, although other frequencies are in use. The primary HFGCS voice frequencies are 4724.0 kHz, 8992.0 kHz, 11175.0 kHz, and 15016.0 kHz. In addition to the HFGCS, U.S. aircraft frequently use Military Auxiliary Radio System (MARS) HF stations (13927.0 kHz) and Canadian Forces HF stations (11232.0 kHz) to relay messages. Various other discrete frequencies are available, and used, as part of the HFGCS network and are not listed here.

Recording of an EAM on the 11175 kHz HFGCS system.

One common use for the HFGCS is to place telephone calls from and to the aircraft in flight by means of the Defense Switched Network (DSN) to an U.S. Air Force base, U.S. Naval Air Station, U.S. Marine Corps Air Station, U.S. Army Airfield, or Air Force Reserve or Air National Guard installations on civilian airports, or Army Reserve or Army National Guard Aviation Support Facilities on civilian airports, to obtain local weather conditions, to arrange for refueling, and to inform the base of the number of passengers and crew. The HFGCS also carries Emergency Action Messages (EAMs).

In addition to EAMs, the HFGCS carries a few other types of messages. A higher priority code for orders is a Skyking Message, which is a time sensitive message for orders that need immediate attention. Force Direction Messages (FDM's) are also sent through the HFGCS, although it is impossible to tell whether the message is an FDM or just another EAM being read.

Although transmissions are often single sideband (SSB), the use of the ALE transmission mode is more and more common. HFGCS complements the use of satellite communications between aircraft and ground stations.

Stations of the HFGCS Network

- Andersen Global, Andersen Air Force Base, Guam, USA
- Andrews Global, Andrews Air Force Base, Maryland, USA
- Ascension Global, RAF Ascension Island/Ascension Auxiliary Field, Ascension Island, British Overseas Territories
- Croughton Global, RAF Croughton, United Kingdom
- Diego Garcia Global, U.S. Naval Support Facility Diego Garcia, British Indian Ocean Territory
- Elmendorf Global, Elmendorf Air Force Base, Alaska, USA
- Hickam Global, Joint Base Pearl Harbor–Hickam (Hickam Air Force Base), Hawaii, USA
- Lajes Global, Lajes Field, Azores, Portugal
- Lincoln Receiver Site (aka West Coast Global), Beale Air Force Base, California, USA
- Offutt Global, Offutt Air Force Base, Nebraska, USA
- Puerto Rico Global, Salinas, Puerto Rico, USA
- Sigonella Global, U.S. Naval Air Station Sigonella, Sicily, Italy
- Yokota Global, Yokota Air Base, Japan

Closed Stations (GHFS and HFGCS)

- Thule Global, Thule Air Base, Greenland
- Keflavík Global, former U.S. Naval Air Station Keflavík, Iceland
- Loring Global, former Loring Air Force Base, Maine, USA
- MacDill Global, MacDill Air Force Base, Florida, USA
- Scott Global, Scott Air Force Base, Illinois, USA
- McClellan Global, former McClellan Air Force Base, California, USA
- Bayonne Global (Bayonne, New Jersey); a former USTRANSCOM station operated by the Surface Deployment and Distribution Command (SDDC) from 1989 to 1999.
