= Azores Air Zone Command =

Comando da Zona Aérea dos Açores (Azores Air Zone Command)
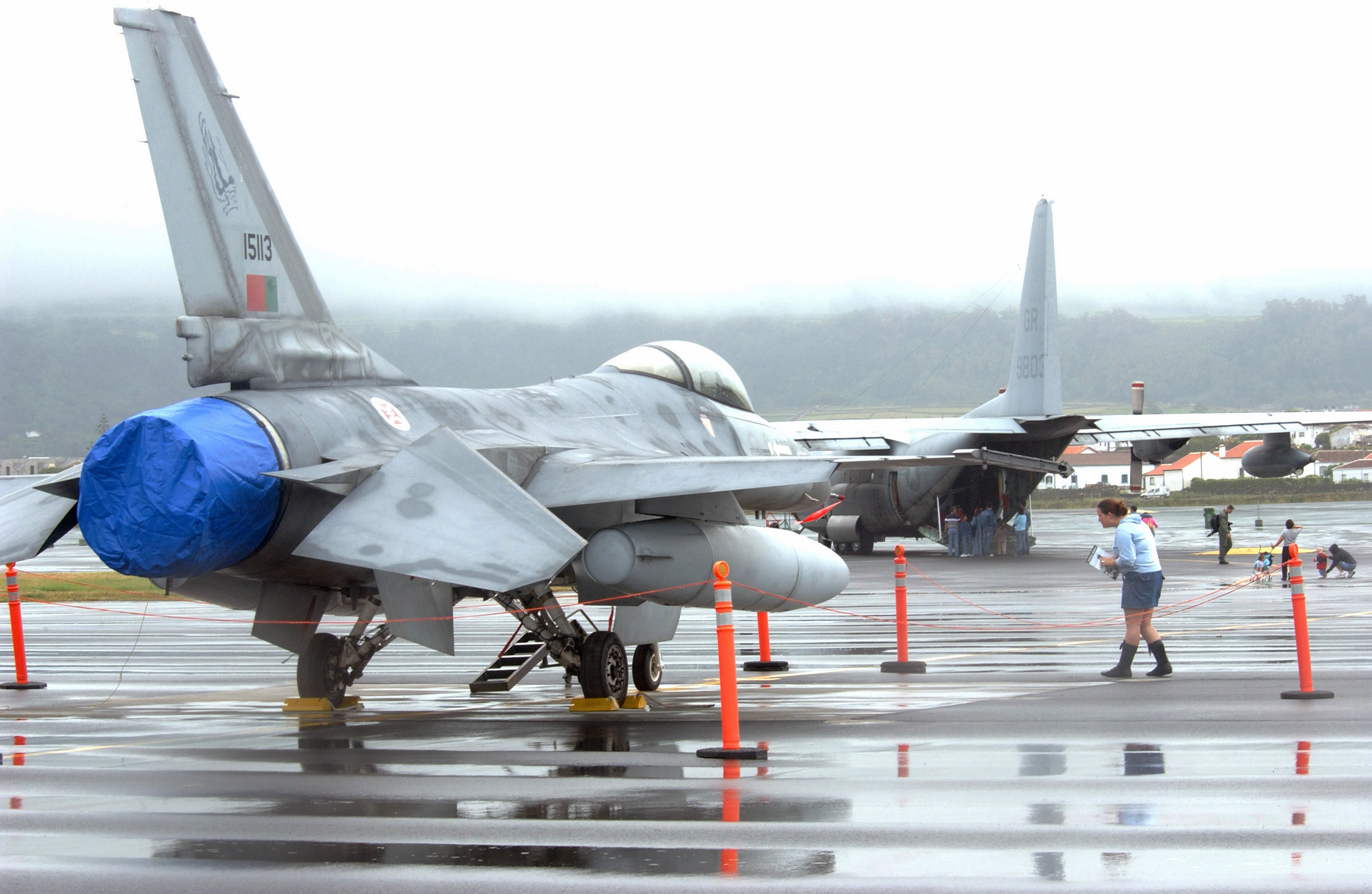
- F-16AM of the Portuguese Air Force at the Lajes Air Base in the Azores.
- Active: 1956
- Country: Portugal
- Branch: Air Force
- Part of: Air Command (CA)
- Garrison/HQ: Air Base No. 4
- Motto(s): "Nós outros, cuja fama tanto voa" ("We, whose fame flies high")

The Azores Air Zone Command (Portuguese: Comando da Zona Aérea dos Açores, ZAA) is a Portuguese Air Force command, responsible for the planning, supervision and control of the readiness of the airpower resources and of the air activity in the area of the Azores islands. It is under the direct dependency of the Air Command.

== Mission ==
The Azores Air Zone Command is responsible for: 1) Plan, direct and control the air activity in its area of responsibility, for the execution of the approved plans and directives; 2) Maintain the relationship with the foreign forces stationed in its bases, accordingly with the terms established in their respective international agreements; 3) Guarantee the respect by the national sovereignty in the terms confirmed by the established international agreements; 4) Study and plan the operational activity of the Portuguese Air Force in the Azores Air Zone; 5) Plan, direct and control the air activity of the Air Force in the Azores Air Zone; 6) Control and coordinate the search and rescue actions in the designated areas of responsibility.

== History ==
The Azores Air Zone (ZAA) was created in 1956 under the dependency of the Command of the 1st Air Region of the Portuguese Air Force. It had the Air Base No. 4, Lajes under its direct command.

From 1977 to 1993, the ZAA Command's designation was changed to Azores Air Command (Portuguese: Comando Aéreo dos Açores, CAA), during which period of time, the commander of the CAA executed simultaneously the functions of commanding officer of the Air Base No. 4.

In 1993, the CAA was disbanded. From 1993 to 1995, the Air Base No. 4 remained the only body of the Portuguese Air Force in the Azores.

In July 1995, the Azores Air Zone Command was reactivated, with the same structure of the previous Azores air commands.

== Commanders ==
- Brigadier pilot-aviator (PILAV) Francisco Chagas (1957 — 1960)
- Colonel PILAV Mário E. Noronha (1960 — 1961)
- Brigadier PILAV Manuel Norton Brandão (1961 — 1963)
- Brigadier PILAV Guilherme Dias Costa (1963 — 1966)
- Brigadier PILAV Rui Tavares Monteiro (1969 — 1971)
- Brigadier PILAV António Costa Maia (1971 — 1973)
- Colonel PILAV Jorge Brochado de Miranda (1973 — 1974)
- Brigadier PILAV Manuel Barbeitos de Sousa (1974)
- Brigadier PILAV Mário Wilton Pereira (1974 — 1975)
- Brigadier PILAV Francisco José Rosa (1975 — 1977)
- Brigadier PILAV Tomás George Conceição Silva (1977 — 1978) — First CAA commander.
- Brigadier PILAV Moura de Carvalho (1978 — 1981)
- Brigadier PILAV Manuel Ramos Lopes (1981 — 1985)
- General PILAV Mário B. Camarada Cortesão (1985 — 1989)
- Brigadier PILAV Manuel Alvarenga de Sousa Santos (1989 — 1990)
- Brigadier PILAV António José Vasques Osório (1990 — October, 1993)
- Brigadier PILAV Fernando Carvalho Seabra (October, 1993 — October, 1995) — Last CAA commander and first commander of the reactivated ZAA.
- Brigadier/Major General PILAV Jorge Lindner Costa (October, 1995 — October, 2000)
- Major General PILAV Fernando Caetano Mendes (February, 2000 — June, 2002)
- Major General PILAV Jorge Antunes de Andrade (June, 2002 — March, 2004)
- Major General PILAV António Mimoso e Carvalho (March, 2004 — March, 2006)
- Major General PILAV Alfredo Pereira da Cruz (March, 2006 — January, 2007)
- Major General PILAV José Ramos Tareco (January, 2007 — October, 2007)
- Major General PILAV Vítor Fernando Valério Fragoso (October, 2007 — ?)
- Colonel PILAV Sílvio Pimenta Sampaio (interim) (? — May, 2008)
- Major General PILAV Rui Mora de Oliveira (May, 2008 — present)
