= Air Force Public Affairs Agency =

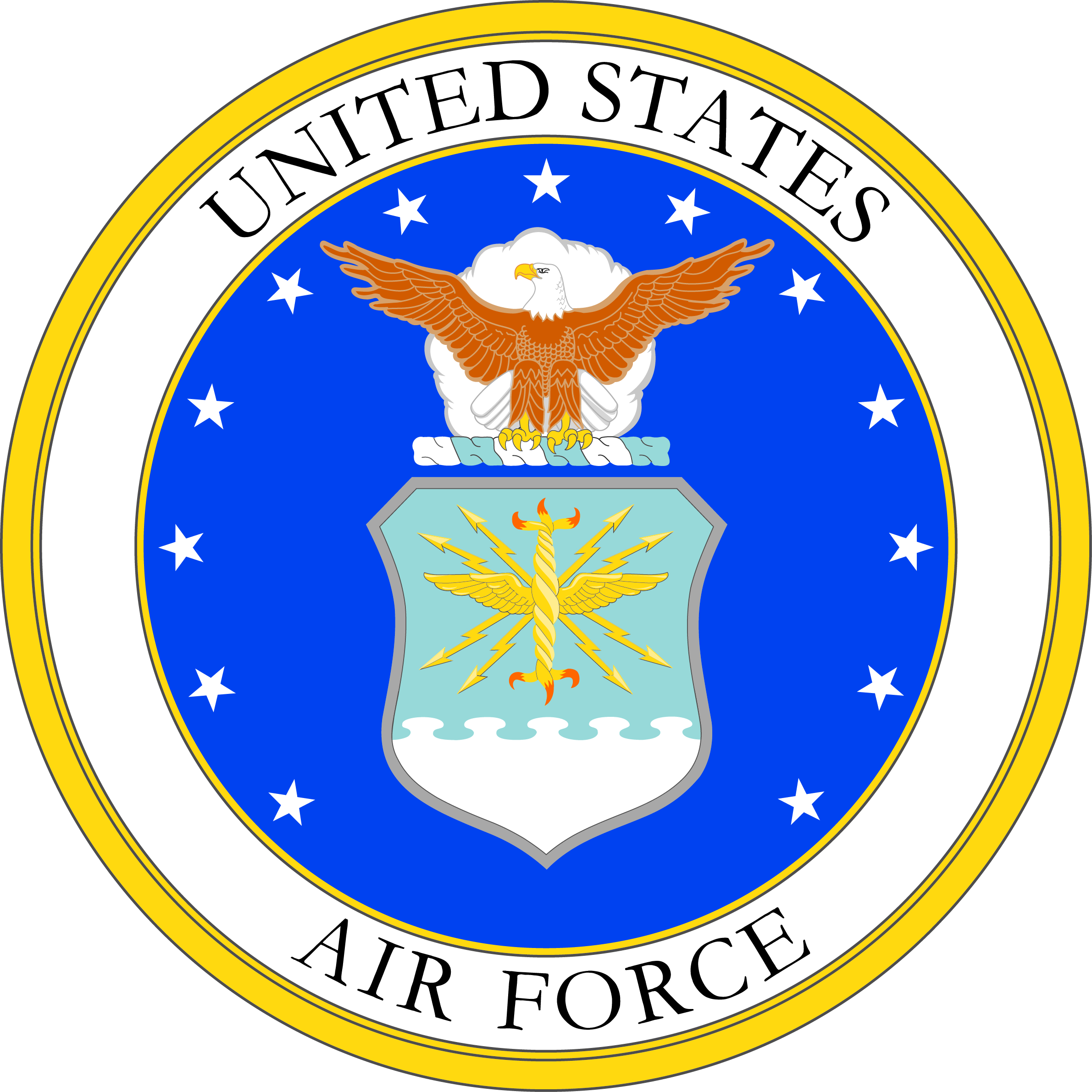
Air Force Public Affairs Agency

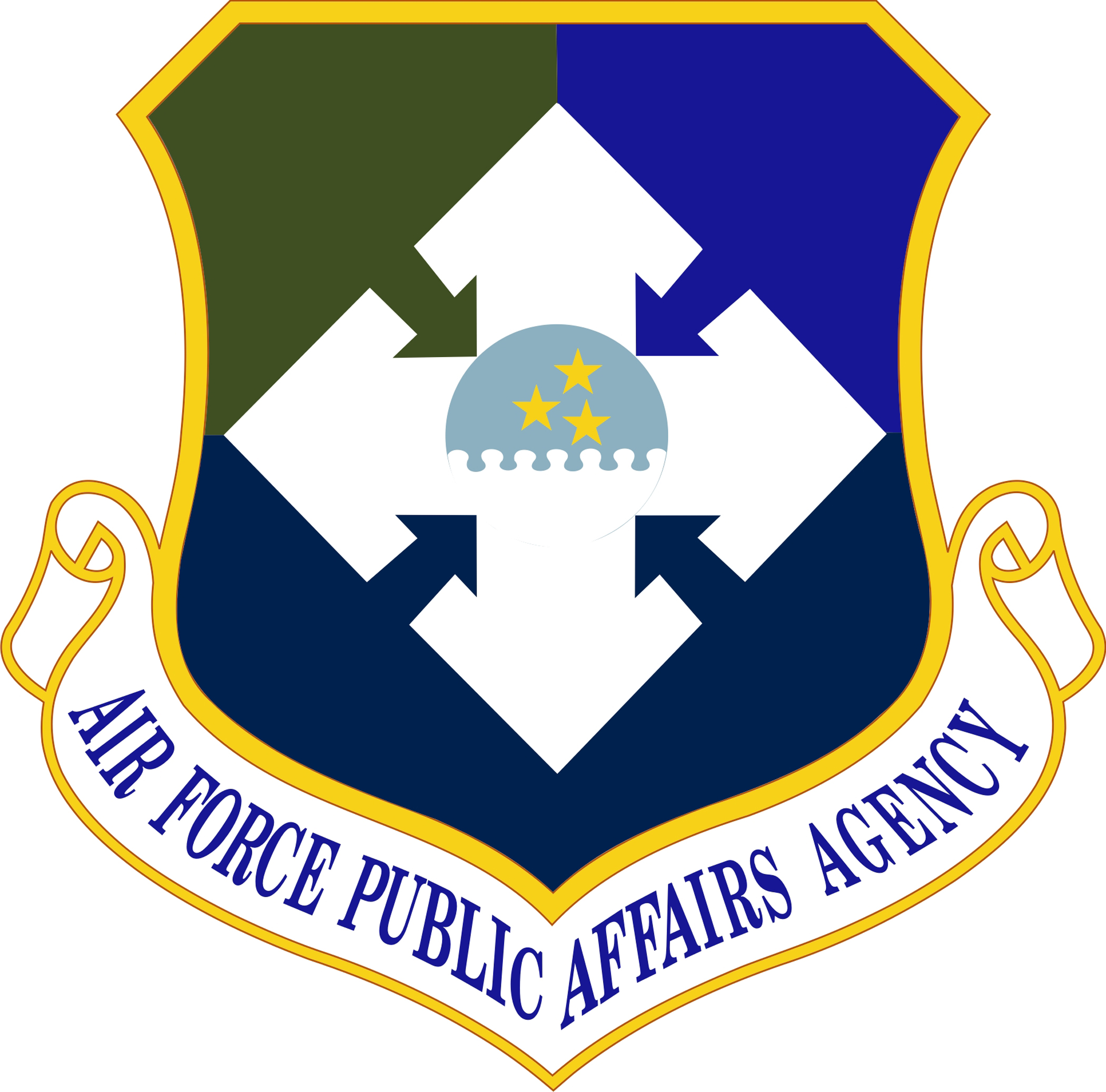
- Air Force Public Affairs Agency Shield
- Active: 1979 – present
- Country: United States
- Branch: United States Air Force
- Role: Public affairs
- Part of: United States Air Force
- Garrison/HQ: Joint Base San Antonio-Randolph, Texas
- Decorations: Organizational Excellence Award

Commanders
- Current commander: Colonel Tony M. Wickman

The Air Force Public Affairs Agency is a United States Air Force field operating agency headquartered at Joint Base San Antonio-Randolph, Texas. Its headquarters consists of two directorates, the Directorates of Staff and Operations. Additionally, it is accountable for two combat camera squadrons, two audiovisual squadrons, and two operating locations. The Directorate of Staff includes financial management, information technology support, knowledge operations, logistics, and personnel and training. The Directorate of Operations includes branding, trademark and licensing, public web, plans and programs, and career field development courses writers.

The agency oversees the 1st Combat Camera Squadron and 4th Combat Camera Squadron co-located at Joint Base Charleston, South Carolina; the 3rd Audiovisual Squadron located at Jount Base San Antonio-Lackland, Texas; and the Air Force's tier 1 video production facility, the 2d Audiovisual Squadron, located at Hill Air Force Base, Utah.

The agency provides administrative and logistical support to six field offices across the United States. These include a command information branch at the Pentagon; Public Affairs assignment managers at the Air Force Personnel Center, JB San Antonio-Randolph, Texas; the Air Force Media Engagement Office in New York City; the Air Force Entertainment Liaison Office in Los Angeles; and the Combat Camera Detachment at Hurlbert AFB, Florida.

Combined, these offices and units encompass representatives from all specialties within the Public Affairs career field, and are charged with a multitude of unique public affairs responsibilities including: providing imagery documentation of Air Force warfighter and humanitarian relief missions; audiovisual production support; the public affairs visual information equipment purchasing program, the public web program, the branding and trademark licensing program, and serving as the Air Force's primary liaison to the Defense Media Activity on Defense Video and Imagery Distribution System and the American Forces Public Information Management System. Additionally, AFPAA serves as the sole force provider for combat camera forces in the Air Force. AFPAA also provides career-field support through the development of career development courses for the Air Force's nearly 5,500 public affairs practitioners.

== Mission ==
Provide airmen with unique public affairs resources to document and convey the Air Force mission and legacy.

== Vision ==
Be the primary innovators of public affairs capabilities supporting global operations.

== History ==
AFPAA traces its roots to 1 June 1978, with the activation of the Air Force Service Information and News Center. AFSINC was redesignated as the Air Force News Center 1 April 1990, and became a field operating agency 5 Feb. 1991. It was redesignated to the Air Force News Agency 1 Aug. 1991, before its redesignation to AFPAA 1 Oct. 2008. AFPAA achieved full operational capability 3 June 2013.

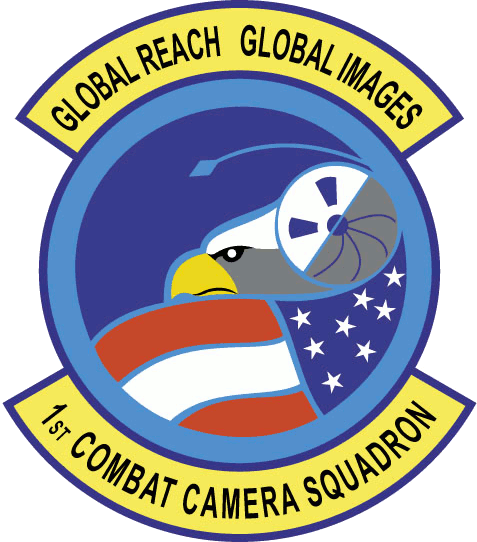
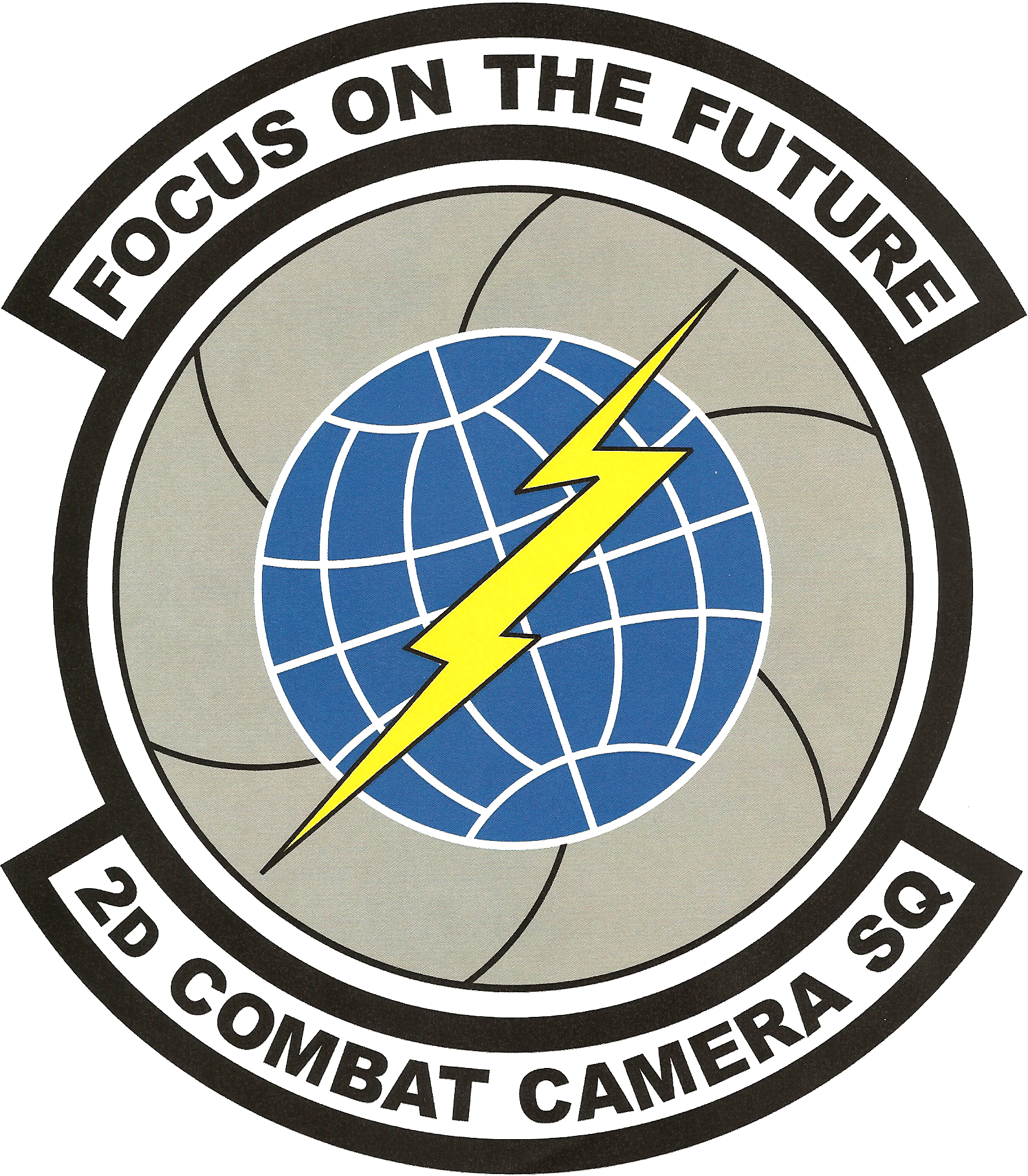
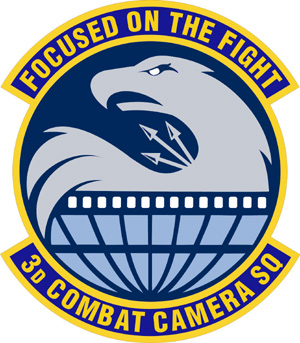
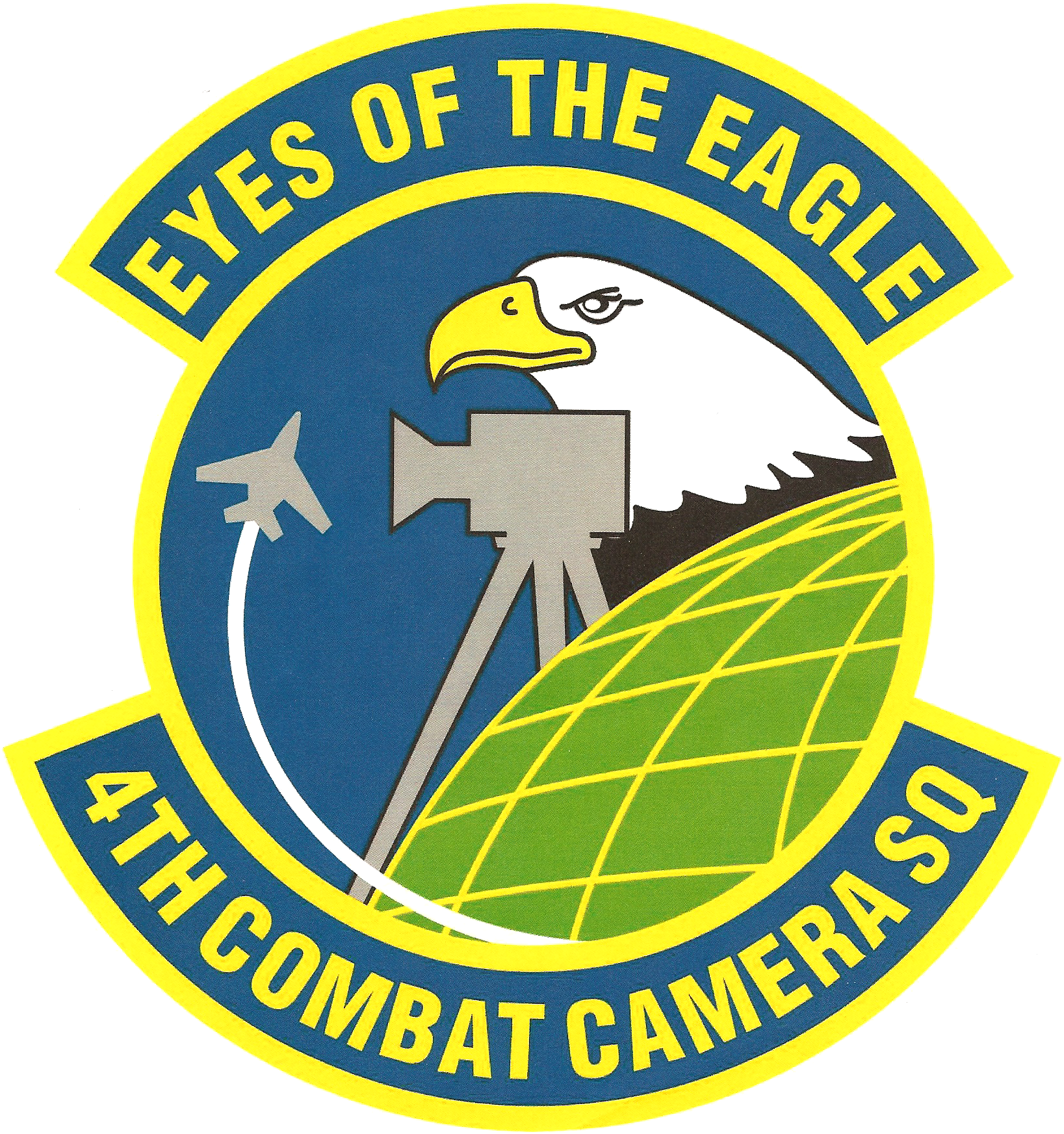
Squadrons
Squadron	Shield	Location	Status
1st Combat Camera Squadron		Joint Base Charleston, South Carolina	Active
2d Audiovisual Squadron		Hill AFB, Utah	Active
3rd Audiovisual Squadron		Joint Base San Antonio, Texas	Active
4th Combat Camera Squadron		Joint Base Charleston, South Carolina	Reserve
