= 751 Squadron (Portugal) =

Squadron 751
- Esquadra 751
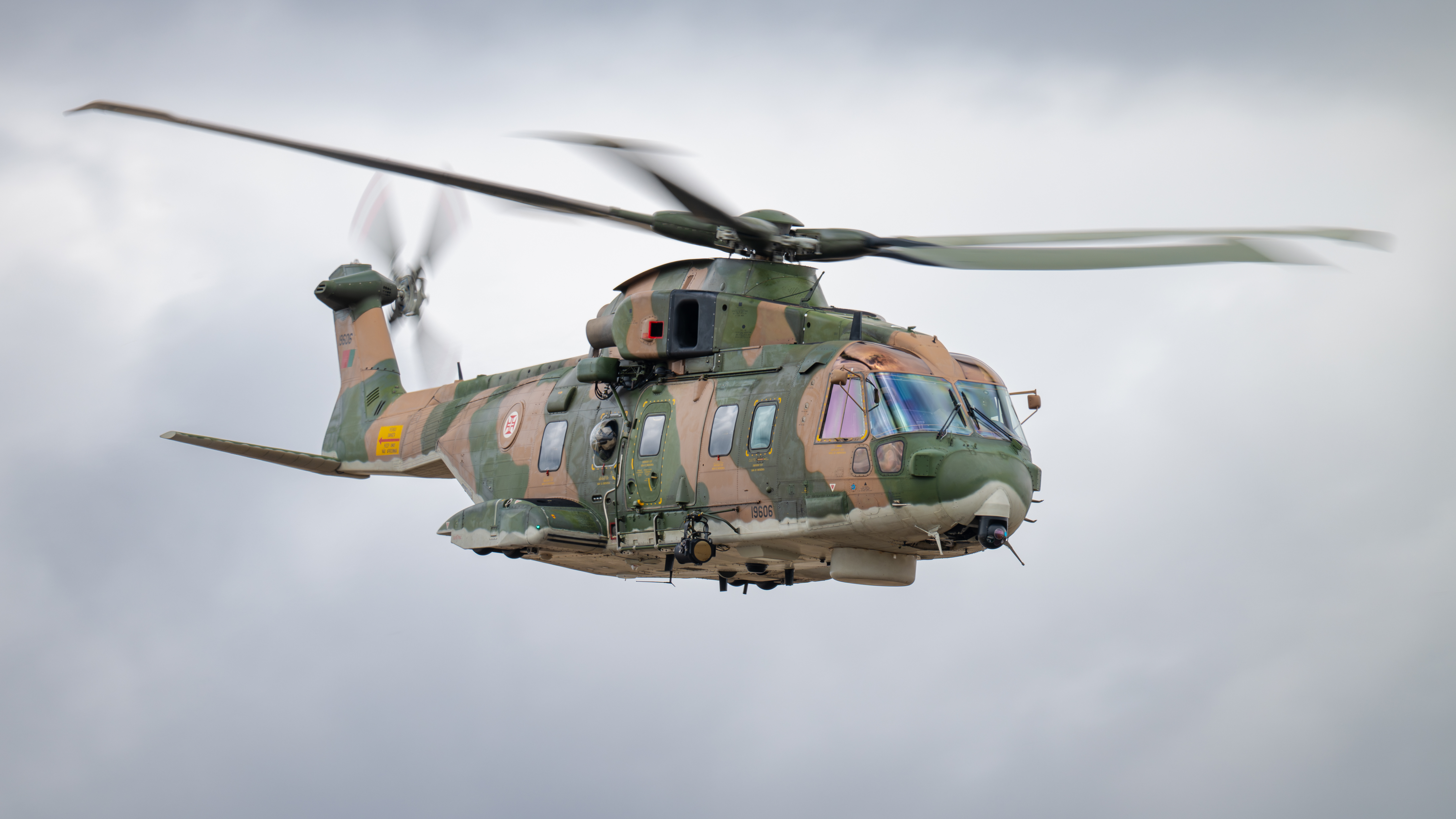
- Portuguese Air Force Agusta-Westland EH-101 Merlin
- Active: 1978
- Country: Portugal
- Branch: Air Force
- Role: Search and rescue
- Home base: Air Base 6
- Nickname: Pumas
- Motto: "Para que outros vivam" (So others may live)
- Website: https://www.emfa.pt/www/po/esquadra/esq751

Commanders
- Current commander: Major Rodolfo Curto

Aircraft flown
- Helicopter: AgustaWestland EH101

The 751 Squadron "Pumas" (Esquadra 751) is a helicopter squadron of the Portuguese Air Force. It is part of Grupo Operacional 61 and it is located in Air Force Base No. 6 (Portuguese: Base Aérea no. 6, BA6), Montijo, south of Lisbon. It operates the AgustaWestland AW101 Merlin. The 751 Squadron motto is "Para que outros vivam" (So others may live). More than 3455 lives have been saved by their crews since 1978.

== History ==
=== 1978–2006 ===
The 751 Squadron was created on April 29, 1978, operating four SA 330 Puma helicopters. At the time, its Primary Mission was Search and Rescue and the Secondary Missions were Tactical and General Air Transport. The SA 330 Puma operated had been previously employed in the Portuguese Colonial War and after the war end were adapted to a new role. These changes made the helicopters able to perform the required search and rescue missions in the Portuguese search and rescue areas of responsibility. To execute these missions a crew of five and a helicopter were in a 24-hour alert at Air Force Base No. 6. In the 1990s a permanent detachment, the Madeira Air Detachment starts operations from Porto Santo airport. This detachment also had a crew and a helicopter on a 24h alert to execute Search and Rescue operations, and has as its secondary mission the execution of tactical and general air transport operations.

=== 2006–today ===
In 2005 the 751 Squadron started to operate the AgustaWestland AW101 Merlin, the SA 330 replacement. On February 11, 2005, the second and third Merlins produced arrived at Portugal. After the crew's conversion to the new helicopter, the AW101 Merlin started its operational activity in Air Base no. 6 on 3 February 2006 and in Madeira Air detachment on the 22nd of the same month. This aircraft upgrade allowed the 751 Squadron to be fitted with the latest helicopter technology, increasing the operational range from 200 NM to 400 NM. After the introduction of the Merlin in the Portuguese Air Force there were major changes in the Portuguese Search and Rescue assets. On 30 November 2006, the Azores Air Detachment was created, operating from Air Base no. 4, from Lajes, Azores. This detachment comprises two helicopters and two crews, having one of the crews on a 24h permanent alert.

In July, 2010, the EH-101 fleet reached the 10 000 hours.

Several other celebrating marks were reached by the 751 Squadron. In de beginning of 2014, the mark of the 3000 saved lives was reached with the rescue of a crew member of the “Flex Endem” ship, that was navigating at 76 nautical miles from Montijo. During this mission the meteorological condition were very bad, especially the sea state, with high foot waves. More recently, on February 11, 2015, the 751 Squadron celebrated the 10th anniversary of EH-101 operation in Portugal. With the arrival of the first Merlins in 2005, that year was necessary to fulfil all the test, trainings and qualification procedures to be ready to fly operational missions. The first real mission of EH-101 was on 10 February 2006. In this mission, the EH-101 crew participate on a major search and rescue mission in Ericeira area.

Since its creation the 751 Squadron has flown more than 58 800 hours, 21 500 of those with EH-101.

== In Portugal's SAR organization ==
Organized Search and Rescue services were created from the need that countries had to provide a Search and Rescue service, maritime and aeronautical, to all craft that enter their areas of responsibility. The existence of a SAR organization in a country creates a safer environment to the maritime and aeronautical industry, allowing the development of these industries and consequently their economic growth. Portugal, being a country with a long maritime history, has a long tradition in providing SAR services. The Portuguese Search and Rescue Region (SRR) has an area of 5 million square kilometers and matches with the Flight Information Region (FIR) of Lisbon and Santa Maria. These FIR's had a growing of 400% in air traffic in the last 20 years.

The Portuguese SRR coincides with Lisbon and Santa Maria Flight Information Regions (FIR). SAR responsibility in Portugal is shared between the Portuguese Air Force, the Portuguese Navy and the Civil Protection National Authority, all working in cooperation. The Portuguese SAR military operational control comprises:

- 2 Rescue Coordination Centers (RCC) in Lisbon and Lajes
- 2 Maritime Rescue Coordination Centers (MRCC) in Lisbon and Ponta Delgada (Azores archipelago)
- 1 Maritime Rescue Sub Center (MRSC) in Funchal (Madeira archipelago)

It is in this control structure that the 751 Squadron is included, with one AW101 Merlin alert helicopter in Montijo Air Force Base, one AW101 Merlin alert helicopter in Support Aerodrome no. 3 in Porto Santo (Madeira archipelago) and two AW101 Merlin helicopters in Lajes Air Force Base no. 4 (Azores archipelago). The Portuguese Air Force also provides other air assets to the SAR organization, including P-3, C-130, C-295, Falcon 50 fixed wing aircraft and AgustaWestland AW119 helicopters.

The capacity provided by the EH-101 is of enormous importance and is currently possible to perform rescue missions at a distance of 400 nautical miles from the take-off point. Despite the large national SAR area of responsibility, the 751 Squadron has provided SAR support to neighboring countries, performing rescue missions in both Spanish and Moroccan Search and Rescue Regions.

== Assigned missions ==
The 751 Squadron is responsible for the following missions:

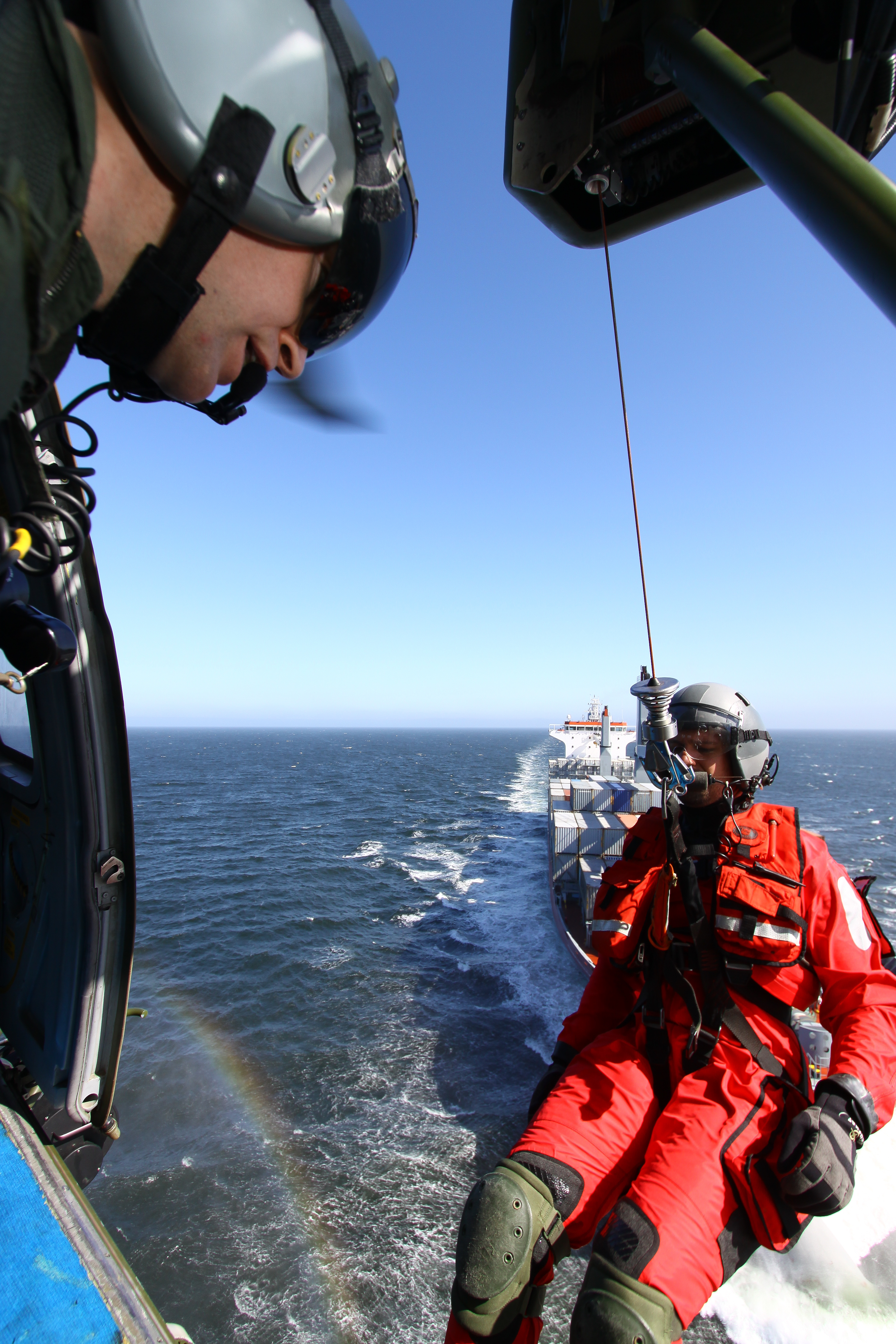
Photography: Menso Van Westrhenen. Search and Rescue training flight with a merchant marine ship.

=== Run tactical support and search and rescue operations ===
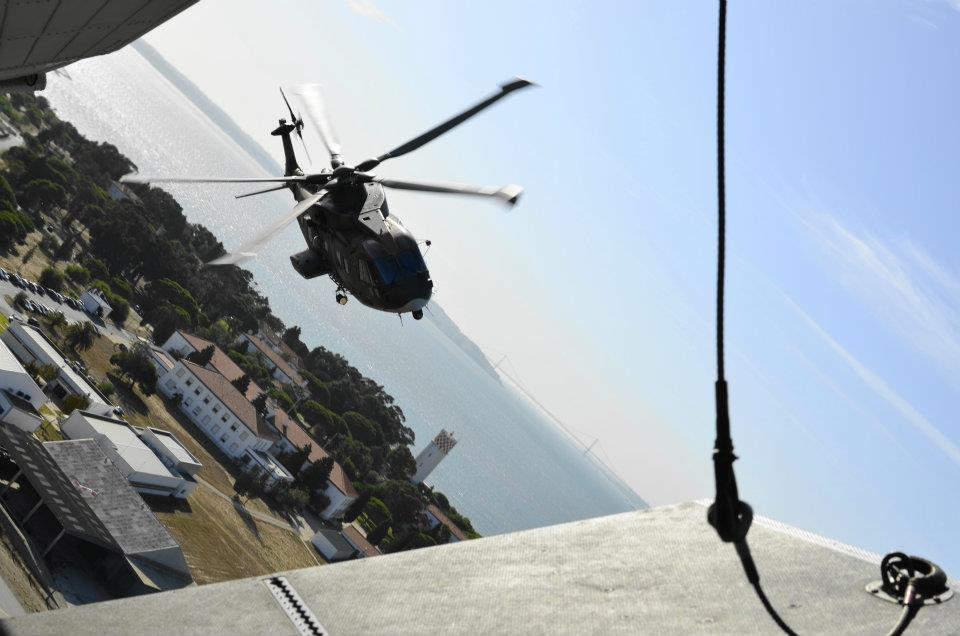
An EH-101 Merlin of 751 Squadron "PUMAS" effects "break formation" under the airbase # 6, Montijo, during a training flight. Photography: Ricardo Nunes

The performance of this mission incorporates the following mission elements :

- Search and rescue and medical evacuation;
- Mobility and assault;
- Tactical and general transport;
- Recognition and support;
- Surveillance and maritime surveillance operations;
- Combatant extraction under CSAR environment ( combat search and rescue ) .

== SAR crew ==
The SAR crew in the Portuguese AW101 Merlin comprises:

- Pilot in Command – Directs, executes and plans all the flight related actions. As the aircraft commander, he is the ultimate responsible for all the decisions taken that are directly linked to the mission progress.
- Co-pilot – Replace the Pilot in Command when needed. Assists the Pilot in Command during the mission. Directs, executes and plans flight related actions.
- Systems Operator – Directs and executes winching operations, search and rescue observer and supports both the medical crews and the passengers. Responsible for the coordination of all the aspects regarding the cabin. Also responsible, for the execution of basic maintenance tasks.
- Rescue Swimmer – Executes the recovery of the victims from either water or land, using the helicopter's winch to be lowered into land or ships. Supports the medical crews and the passengers under the Systems Operator supervision.
- Flight Nurse – Evaluates and provides the needed health care to victims. It's the connection point between the flight crew and the external medical crew.

If needed, a specialized medical team may be taken on board during any SAR mission.

== Notable missions ==
=== SA 330 Puma ===
Performed with the SA 330, the assembling of a very large antenna (283 meters) in the town of Muge, the placement of the power lines to the village of S. Romão in Serra da Estrela, the installation of Bugio's lighthouse dome in 1981, as well as 163 missions during the Tejo river floods in 1979 and 1983 totaling 255 flight hours, 1386 people evacuated and 11.244 kg of cargo air lifted. Support was also provided during the rescue operations following the Portuguese biggest train accident – in Alcafache – on September 11, 1985, were several injured people were transported to Viseu, Oporto and Lisbon hospitals. Search and Rescue missions include the winching of 15 sailors during the shipwreck of the ship "Angel del Mar" and the winching of 17 sailors from the ship "Bolman III", on January 10, 1994. On Christmas Eve of 2000, one SA 330 rescued 22 sailors from the ship "Coral Bunker" that ran ashore in Viana do Castelo. This was, until now, the mission where the most people were rescued during a single sortie. VIP missions include the transport of Pope John Paul II on his three visits to Portugal.

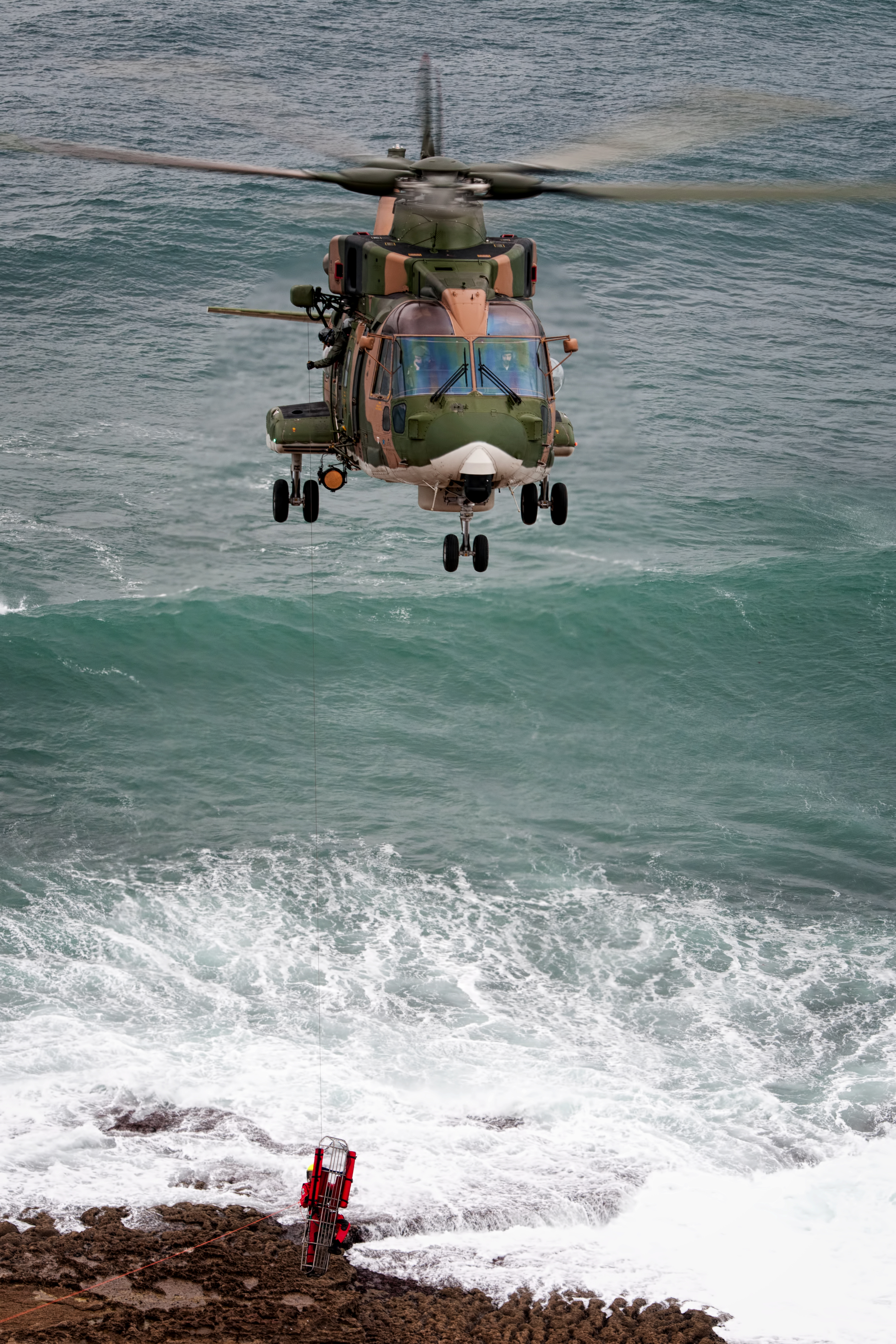
Search and Rescue training flight on the Portuguese coast. Photography: Lloyd Horgan

=== AW-101 Merlin ===
In 2010, the transport of Pope Benedict XVI in his first visit to Portugal. The 751 Squadron was in different occasions, requested to provide support to neighbouring countries, such as Spain and Morocco. As an example, the support provided during the rescue of the sailors of the sunk "MV KEA", 180NM off the coast of Galiza, Spain, in March 2010. The crew that performed this mission was later awarded, by SASEMAR (the Spanish agency responsible for the Search and Rescue services in Spain) the "Ancla de Plata" award, an annual prize that intends to congratulate crews and people that contribute to SAR or Anti-pollution missions. In December 2011, the 6 missing fishermen from the fishing vessel "Virgem do Sameiro" were located and rescue by one of the 751 helicopters, north of Figueira da Foz. Their ship had sunk 3 days before and the fishermen had been adrift in a life raft. At February 3, 2013, a crew deployed Air Base 4, Lajes rescued a lone yachtsman 700 km from Lajes at night. Javier Sanso, was in the liferaft since the shipwrecked of his sailboat and was at the ocean without assistance. In October 2014, during a storm two Finnish sailors needed to be rescued. The mast of the sailboat "Chilom" was gone and they found themselves drifting. In a very adverse weather conditions it was possible to rescue the two safely. During an international Search and Rescue exercise, a crew has been activated to rescue 4 sailboat, passengers of "S / V Kolibri" which had become damaged. Comprising 8 hours and 30 minutes of actual flying time, and the distress call coming from just over 400 nautical miles, this rescue has been acknowledged as the Portuguese Air Force's longest search and rescue mission with the longest distance covered. On 29 February, the 751 Squadron rescued 10 crew member of the fishing ship "Ilhas do Mar" in the Madeira archipelago.

== Aircraft ==
- SA 330 Puma (1978–2006)
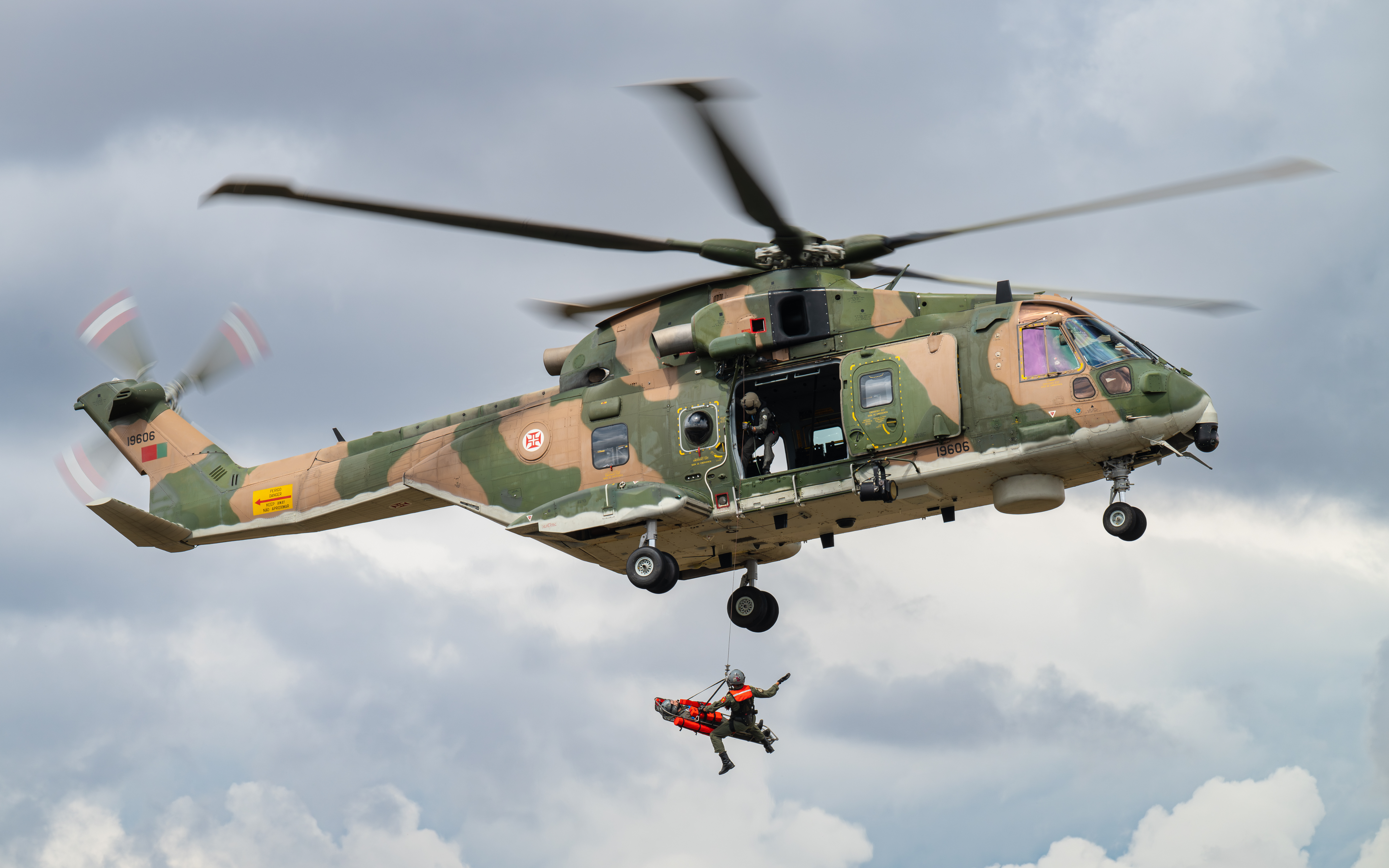
  Merlin performing a search and rescue demonstration.
- AW101 Merlin (2006–today)

The EH-101 Merlin is a medium transport helicopter, trimotor with tricycle landing train, semi-retractable, with dual wheels on each unit and five main rotor blades.

The FAP bought 12 EH-101 in three different versions for three different types of missions. The fleet consists of 6 SAR (Search and Rescue) version, 2 SIFICAP version (Supervision of Fisheries) and 4 CSAR (Combat Search and Rescue) version. It has an emergency floats system, 2 built boats of 14 people capacity, 1 primary and a secondary winch, NITESUN and FLIR. It is equipped with a GALILEO search RADAR with ability to identify and monitor 32 surface targets simultaneously. All aircraft have the capability to operate in NVG environment. The CSAR embodiment is equipped with "Defensive AIDS Suite" (DAS) consisting of an integrated electronic self-protection, comprising the following subsystems: one "Radar Warning Receiver" (RWR), a "Missile Warning System" (MWS) and a "Counter Measures Dispensing System" (WSSD). All helicopters have the ability to refuel "Hovering In Flight Refueling" (HIRF) and also have provisions for the possible use of "Air to Air Refueling" (AAR) (4 probes have been acquired to equip CSAR models).

== Awards and decorations ==
Among many awards, honours, references and prizes awarded to 751 Squadron "Pumas", the following stand out:

- Praise by the General COFA (Air Force Operational Command), April 27, 1994.
- Service Medal Distinguished Grade Gold, granted by His Excellency, the President of the Republic, Dr. Mário Soares, September 19, 1995.
- Presidential praise given by His Excellency the President of the Republic, Jorge Sampaio, March 7, 2006.
- Merit Diploma "IFFR Safety Award" given by the Aero Club of Portugal and the International Fellowship of Flying Rotarians to Squadrons 751 and 752, in recognition of actions performed in Search and Rescue operations in February 2007.
- Praise by His Excellency Chief of the Air Force, General Luís Araújo, December 2, 2009.
- Award "Ancla de Plata 2010" awarded by the Spanish National Radio and the SASEMAR - Rescue Sociedad y Seguridad Marítima- (institution responsible for search and rescue in Spain) for the rescue of five crew members of the ship "MV KEA" off the Galician coast in March 2010.
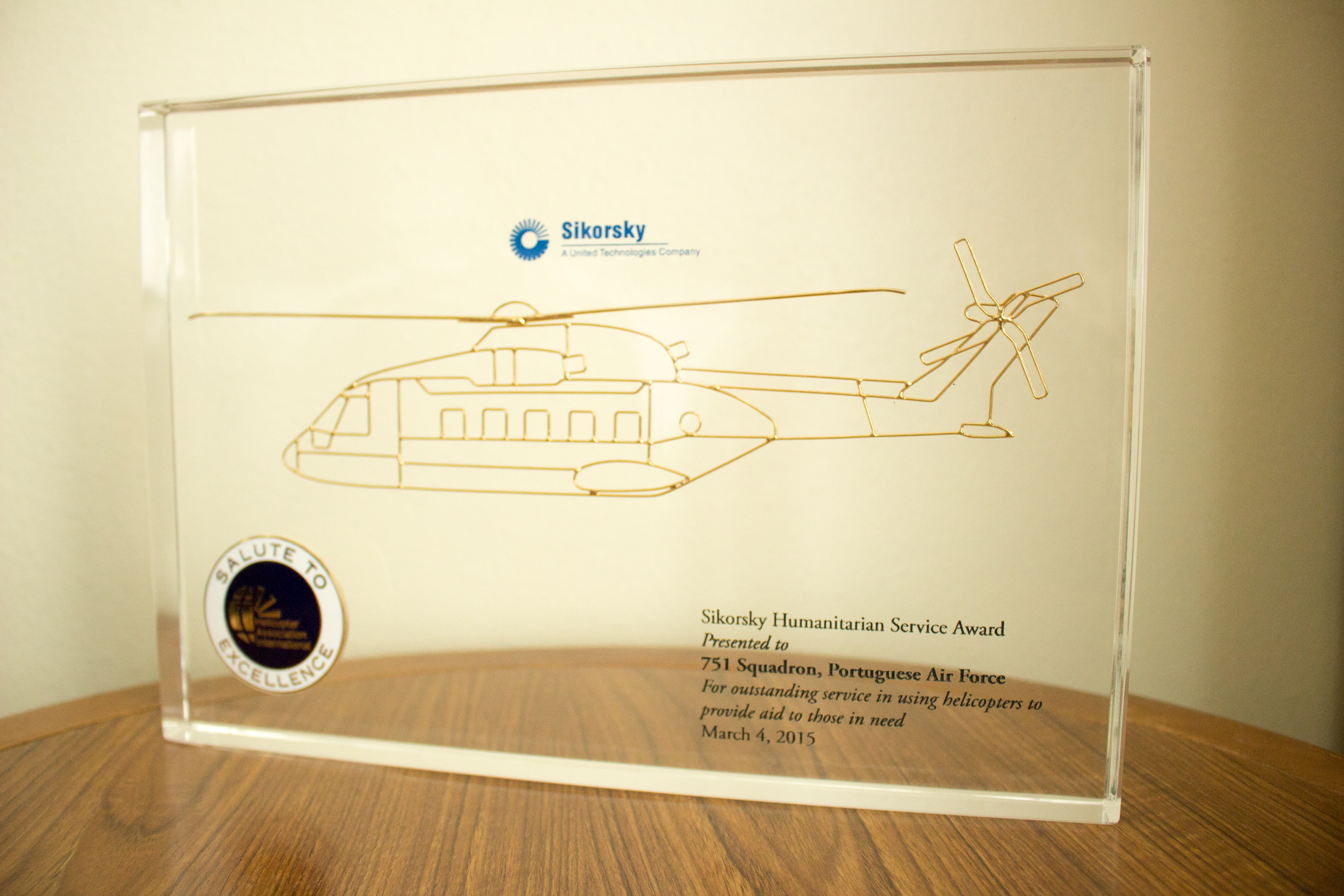
  Prize awarded by the Helicopter Association International.
- Medal of Municipal Merit, awarded by the city of Vila do Conde, for the performance in the rescue mission of six fishing vessel "Virgin Sameiro", June 24, 2012.
- Sikorsky Humanitarian Service Award, awarded by the International Helicopter Association by excellent performance over the years in search and rescue missions, 3 March 2015.
- Medal of Good Municipal Services in bronze, awarded by the city of Praia da Vitoria, during the commemoration of the 35th anniversary of the elevation of the Victoria Beach to city, acknowledging the services rendered to the community, in its action in search and rescue missions and inter-island transport in the Azores archipelago, 20 June 2016.
