= List of aircraft of the Portuguese Armed Forces =

This list of current and former aircraft of the Portuguese Armed Forces also includes aircraft of the National Republican Guard.

== Air Force ==
The Portuguese Air Force (PoAF) was founded in 1952 as the result of the amalgamation of the Aeronáutica Militar and Aviação Naval. With the merger many aircraft were transferred from these earlier aviation services to the Air Force, having been in service before 1952.

| Aircraft | Qty | In service | Retired | Origin | Notes |
|---|---|---|---|---|---|
| de Havilland DH-82 Tiger Moth | 30(?) | 1952 | 1954 | UK; Portugal | Received from Aeronáutica Militar and Aviação Naval |
| de Havilland DH-82A Tiger Moth | 30(?) | 1952 | 1954 | UK; Portugal | Received from Aeronáutica Militar and Aviação Naval |
| Junkers Ju 52 | 12 | 1952 | 1972 | Germany | Received from Aeronáutica Militar |
| Junkers Ju 52/3 mg3e | 12 | 1952 | 1972 | Germany | Received from Aeronáutica Militar |
| Amiot A.A.C.1 Toucan | 15 | 1961 | 1972 | France | |
| Miles Master II/III | ? | 1952 | 1958 | UK | Received from Aeronáutica Militar |
| Miles Martinet T.T.1 | ? | 1952 | ? | UK | Received from Naval Aviation |
| Douglas C-47 Dakota | 29 | 1952 | 1976 | USA | One aircraft received from Aeronáutica Militar in 1952. Remaining aircraft bought in 1958 |
| Hawker Hurricane IIB/IIC | 151 | 1952 | 1954 | UK | Received from Aeronáutica Militar |
| Airspeed Oxford | ? | 1952 | 1957 | UK | Received from Aeronáutica Militar |
| Airspeed Oxford II | ? | 1952 | 1957 | UK | Received from Naval Aviation |
| Supermarine Spitfire VB | ? | 1952 | ? | UK | Received from Aeronáutica Militar |
| Miles Magister I | 8 | 1952 | 1956 | UK | Received from Aeronáutica Militar |
| Avro Anson T.1 | 10 | 1952 | ? | UK | Received from Aeronáutica Militar |
| North American AT-6 Texan | 257 | 1952 | 1978 | USA | Received from Aeronáutica Militar |
| North American SNJ-4 | 257 | 1952 | 1978 | USA | Received from Naval Aviation |
| North American Harvard Mk.III | 257 | 1956 | 1978 | USA | Former British Fleet Air Arm aircraft |
| North American T-6G Texan | 257 | 1961 | 1978 | USA | Former-French Air Force aircraft |
| North American Harvard Mk.IV | 257 | 1964 | 1978 | Canada | Former-Luftwaffe aircraft |
| North American Harvard Mk.IIA | 257 | 1969 | 1978 | Canada | Former-South African Air Force aircraft |
| North American Harvard Mk.III | 257 | 1969 | 1978 | Canada | Former-South African Air Force aircraft |
| Boeing SB-17G Flying Fortress | 5 | 1952 | 1960 | USA | Received from Aeronáutica Militar |
| Douglas C-54 Skymaster | 8 | 1947 | 1952 | USA | Some Ex-Aeronáutica Militar |
| SC-54/HC-54 Searchmaster | 10 | 1952 | ? | USA | Ex-Aeronáutica Militar |
| de Havilland DH-89A Dragon Rapide | 1 | 1952 | 1968 | UK | Ex-Aeronáutica Militar |
| de Havilland Canada DHC-1 Chipmunk | 10 | 1952 | 1997 | UK | Ex-Aeronáutica Militar |
| de Havilland Canada DHC-1 Chipmunk | 66 | 1952 | 1997 | Portugal | Built under license by OGMA; As of 1997 six airframes refurbished |
| Grumman G-21B Goose | 9 | 1952 | 1960 | USA | Received from Naval Aviation |
| Piper PA-18/L-21 B Super Cub | 22 | 1955 | 1976 | USA | Received from the Portuguese Army Artillery arm |
| Piper PA-18/L-18 SL21A | 5 | 1955 | 1976 | USA | |
| Piper PA-18-125 Super Cub | 5 | 1954 | 1976 | USA | |
| Grumman G-44 Widgeon | 12 | 1952 | 1962 | USA | Received from Naval Aviation |
| Fleet F-10G | 1 | 1952 | ? | USA | Received from Naval Aviation |
| Beechcraft AT-11 Kansan | 6 | 1952 | 1977 | USA | First units received from Naval Aviation |
| Beechcraft D-18S | 15 | 1952 | 1977 | USA | First units received from Naval Aviation |
| C-45 Expeditor | 15 | 1959 | 1976 | USA | First units received from Naval Aviation |
| Curtiss SB2C-5 Helldiver | 6 | 1952 | 1952 | USA | Received from Naval Aviation |
| Republic F-47D Thunderbolt | 50 | 1952 | 1956 | USA | |
| Lockheed T-33A Shooting Star | 28 | 1952 | 1991 | USA | |
| de Havilland Vampire T.55 | 2 | 1952 | 1962 | UK | |
| Lockheed PV-2C/D Harpoon | 42 | 1953 | 1975 | USA | Only 34 flown |
| Republic F-84G Thunderjet | 125 | 1953 | 1974 | USA | |
| Grumman SA-16A Albatross | 3 | 1954 | 1962 | USA | |
| Sikorsky UH-19A | 2 | 1954 | 1960 | USA | First helicopter operated in Portugal. Used only in search and rescue operations in Azores. Removed from service after an accident on October 4, 1959 |
| Sud Aviation Alouette II | 7 | 1958 | 1976 | France | More received for the Portuguese Republican National Guard |
| North American F-86F Sabre | 65 | 1958 | 1980 | USA | |
| Canadair T-33A-N Silver Star | 5 | 1959 | 1960 | Canada | |
| Hunting Jet Provost | 1 | 1959 | 1959 | UK | Received PoAF markings for demonstration but wasn't bought |
| Lockheed RT-33A | 2 | 1960 | 1982 | USA | |
| Lockheed P2V-5 Neptune | 12 | 1960 | 1977 | USA | |
| Auster D.5/108&180 | 76 | 1960 | 1976 | UK | |
| Nord Noratlas N.2502 | 12 | 1960 | 1978 | France | |
| Nord Noratlas N.2501D | 18 | 1960 | 1978 | France | |
| Auster D.5/160 | 99 | 1961 | 1976 | UK; Portugal | 84 built under license by OGMA |
| Dornier Do 27 A1/A3/A4/B1 | 146 | 1961 | 1979 | Germany | |
| Max Holste M.H.1521 Broussard | 4 | 1961 | 1977 | France | |
| Douglas DC-6A | 4 | 1961 | 1978 | USA | |
| Douglas DC-6B | 6 | 1961 | 1978 | USA | |
| Saunders-Roe Skeeter | 10 | 1961 | 1961 | UK | Delivered in July from German Army Aviation Corps and German Navy stocks, never flew due to being non-airworthy and lack of spares to be rebuilt |
| Cessna T-37C | 30 | 1961 | 1992 | USA | |
| Sud Aviation Alouette III SA 319 | 142 | 1963 | 2020 | France | Additional airframes bought to be used as source for spare parts and to rebuild damaged airframes.. Retired 17 June 2020. |
| Douglas B-26B Invader | 7 | 1965 | 1975 | USA | |
| Douglas B-26C Invader | 7 | 1965 | 1975 | USA | |
| Fiat G.91R/4 | 40 | 1965 | 1993 | Italy | |
| Cessna 310B | 1 | 1969 | 1974 | USA | |
| Cessna 182C | 1 | 1969 | ? | USA | |
| Sud Aviation SA-330C Puma | 13 | 1969 | 2011 | France | Retired in 2006, re-entered service in 2008 in Azores, finally retired in 2011. On the market to be sold(2015) |
| Aérospatiale Puma SA-330S1 Puma | 13 | 1971 | 2011 | France | Retired in 2006, re-entered service in 2008 in Azores, finally retired in 2011. On the market to be sold(2015) |
| Cessna 206 | 1 | 1969 | ? | USA | |
| Piper PA-32 Cherokee Six | 4 | 1970 | 1974 | USA | |
| Cessna 401B | 1 | 1971 | 1974 | USA | Used PoAF markings in special missions |
| Cessna 185A Skywagon | 5 | 1971 | 1974 | USA | Received from South African Air Force |
| Boeing 707-3F5C | 2 | 1971 | 1976 | USA | Transferred to TAP |
| CASA C-212-100 Aviocar | 24 | 1974 | 2010 | Spain | Replaced by CASA C-295M |
| Cessna Skymaster FTB-337G | 32 | 1974 | 2007 | USA | |
| Fiat G.91R/3 | 70 | 1976 | 1993 | Italy | Only 34 flown, others were used for spares |
| Fiat G.91T/3 | 26 | 1976 | 1993 | Italy | Only 11 flown |
| Northrop T-38A Talon | 12 | 1977 | 1994 | USA | |
| Lockheed C-130H Hercules | 6 | 1977 | | USA | 4 operational units being modernized with a glass cockpit and new avionics by OGMA since 2019. |
| Lockheed C-130H-30 Hercules | 6 | 1977 | | USA | 4 operational units being modernized with a glass cockpit and new avionics by OGMA since 2019. |
| Vought A-7P Corsair II | 44 | 1981 | 1999 | USA | |
| Vought TA-7C Corsair II | 1 | 1982 | 1984 | USA | One example (s/n 154404; c/n B-044), nicknamed "Pomba Branca" (white dove), leased from the USN for pilot conversion |
| Vought TA-7P Corsair II | 6 | 1984 | 1999 | USA | |
| Fournier RF-10 | 4 | 1984 | 1994 | France | |
| Dassault Falcon 20 DC | 2 | 1985 | 1993 | France | Used in VIP transport and MEDEVAC. Sold on the civilian market |
| Dassault Falcon 20 DC | 1 | 1985 | 2005 | France | Used in VIP transport, MEDEVAC and radio calibration. Preserved at Museu do Ar |
| Lockheed P-3P Orion | 6 | 1985 | 2011 | USA | ex-RAAF P-3B c. 1968 and replaced by former-Dutch P-3C Update II.5/CUP-CG. One being used for crew training by CFMTFA. |
| Alexander Schleicher ASK 21 | 4 | 1986 | | Germany | |
| Aérospatiale Epsilon TB-30 | 18 | 1989 | | France; Portugal | Assembled in Portugal by OGMA |
| Dassault Falcon 50 | 3 | 1990 | | France | |
| Dassault-Breguet/Dornier Alpha Jet A | 50 | 1993 | 2018 | France; Germany | Former-Luftwaffe aircraft, offered by Germany for the use of the Beja Air Base — BA11 |
| General Dynamics F-16A OCU Fighting Falcon | 17 | 1994 | | USA | Peace Atlantis I aircraft. Converted and updated to Mid Life Update (MLU) standard (F-16 AM/BM) by the Air Force workshops at Monte Real Air Base and OGMA |
| General Dynamics F-16B OCU Fighting Falcon | 3 | 1994 | | USA | Peace Atlantis I aircraft. Converted and updated to Mid Life Update (MLU) standard (F-16 AM/BM) by the Air Force workshops at Monte Real Air Base and OGMA |
| CASA C-212-300 Aviocar | 2 | 1994 | 2011 | Spain | Replaced by C-295MPA |
| LET L-23 Blanik | 3 | 1996 | 2022 | Czech Republic | Retired from active service in 2022 |
| de Havilland Canada DHC-1 Chipmunk Lycoming engine | 7 | 1997 | | UK; Portugal | Refurbished from existing de Havilland Canada DHC-1 Chipmunk aircraft |
| General Dynamics F-16A Fighting Falcon | 23 | 1999 | | USA | Peace Atlantis II aircraft. Updated to Mid Life Update (MLU) standard (F-16 AM/BM) by the Air Force workshops at Monte Real Air Base and OGMA 9 F-16 AM and 3 F-16 BM transferred to the Romanian Air Force in 2015–2016. 3 ex-USAF F-16s including 2 F-16A and 1 F-16B delivered in 2019. |
| General Dynamics F-16B Fighting Falcon | 5 | 1999 | | USA | Peace Atlantis II aircraft. Updated to Mid Life Update (MLU) standard (F-16 AM/BM) by the Air Force workshops at Monte Real Air Base and OGMA 9 F-16 AM and 3 F-16 BM transferred to the Romanian Air Force in 2015–2016. 3 ex-USAF F-16s including 2 F-16A and 1 F-16B delivered in 2019. |
| Advanced Ceramics Research Silver Fox | 2 | 2004 | ? | USA | Used by the Portuguese Air Force Academy for research and development of aeronautical components and UAV systems |
| AgustaWestland EH101 | 12 | 2005 | | UK; Italy | 6 Search and rescue variant, 4 Combat search and rescue variant and 2 fisheries protection variant. |
| Lockheed P-3C Update II.5/CUP-CG Orion | 5 | 2006 | | USA | Former-Dutch Navy aircraft. Receive electronics upgrade to CUP+ standard. Since 2023, these aircraft are being modernized in Canada by General Dynamics Mission Systems to CUP+ Block II standard. |
| CASA C-295 | 12 | 2008 | | Spain | 7 Transport aircraft (PG01) and 5 Maritime patrol aircraft (C-295 MPA, three PG02 and two PG03). |
| ANTEX-M | 4 | 2008 | ? | Portugal | Unmanned Air Vehicle prototype developed by the Portuguese Air Force Academy. At least four built and operated |
| General Dynamics F-16B Fighting Falcon | 3 | 2016 | | USA | Originally intended for Romania after undergoing upgrade; instead acquired to replace 3 Portuguese F-16 BM transferred to the Romanian Air Force. Updated to Mid Life Update (MLU) standard (F-16 BM) by the Air Force workshops at Monte Real Air Base and OGMA |
| Eurocopter AS350 B3 | 3 | 2018 | | France | 3 helicopters acquired by the Portuguese government in 2007 for the extinct public company EMA - Empresa de Meios Aéreos. These helicopters were transferred to the Portuguese Air Force in 2018. |
| Leonardo AW119 Koala Mk. II | 7 | 2019 | | UK; Italy | Assembled at Leonardo's Philadelphia facility. Two additional units received in 2023. |
| UAVision OGASSA OGS42 | 12 | 2020 | | Portugal | Unmanned Air Vehicle used for Surveillance and Recognition, 4 of them equipped with VTOL capacity |
| Kamov Ka-32A11BC | 6 | 2022 | 2024 | Russia | 6 helicopters acquired by the Portuguese government in 2006 for the extinct public company EMA - Empresa de Meios Aéreos. This firefighting helicopters were received in 2022 from the Portuguese National Emergency and Civil Protection Authority. In October 2022 the Ministry of National Defence confirms that the 6 helicopters will be sent to Ukraine as military aid due the 2022 Russian invasion of Ukraine. The helicopters were received by Ukraine in 2024. |
| Dassault Falcon 900 | 1 | 2023 | | France | Plane seized by the Portuguese Authorities and reverted to the Portuguese Air Force. |
| Embraer C-390 Millennium | 3+3 | 2023 | | Brasil Portugal | Five C-390s ordered in 2019 and one ordered in 2025. Partially assembled by OGMA. |
| Sikorsky UH-60 Black Hawk | 5+8 | 2023 | | USA | The Portuguese Air Force signed in August 2022 the acquisition of 6 UH-60A helicopters. The Air Force announced in 2024 that has ordered 3 additional UH-60L helicopters. In 2026, Ace Aeronautics was selected to deliver 4 additional UH-60L helicopters. |
| Lockheed P-3C Orion Cup II | 5+1 | 2023 | | USA | The Government of Portugal acquired, for 45 million euros, 6 aircraft together with Mid-Life Upgrade (MLU) sets, spare parts, support equipment and test benches, as well as flight simulators and tactical procedures. The aircraft will be received from 2023 to 2027. |
| Embraer A29-N Super Tucano | 5+7 on order | 2025 | | Brasil Portugal | The Portuguese Air Force ordered 12 A-29N Super Tucano in 2024 for light ground attack and training. These aircraft will be partially assembled by OGMA. |
| Tekever ARX | 8 on order | 2026 | | Portugal | A total of 8 Tekever ARX Unmanned surveillance and reconnaissance aerial vehicles ordered in 2025. |
| Tecnam P-Mentor | 7 on order | 2026 | | Italy | Ordered by the Air Force to replace the 7 DHC-1 Chipmunk aircraft in service. |
| Canadair CL-515 | 2 on order | 2026 | | Canada | Two units purchased in 2022 to fight forest fires. To be received in 2026 |

== Army ==
After Military Aeronautics became an independent branch, the Portuguese Army activated a small aviation component in its Artillery Arm. This aviation component was disbanded in 1955, with its aircraft and role being transferred to the Air Force. The Army even signed two contracts for the purchase of helicopters, the first in the late 90s for the purchase of Eurocopter EC635 helicopters, which was canceled in 2002 due the lack of a certification to fire HOT 2 anti-tank missiles. In 2012 the acquisition of 10 NH-90 helicopters was canceled after the economic crisis that hit the country that year. The Portuguese Army would only operate air assets in the 21st century, where it currently employs a wide range of UAVs.

| Aircraft | Qty | In service | Retired | Origin | Notes |
|---|---|---|---|---|---|
| Piper PA-18/L-21 B Super Cub | 22 | 1952 | 1955 | USA | Transferred to the PoAF (Used by former Army Artillery Arm) |
| Griffon Aerospace MQM-170 Outlaw | ? | 2012 | | USA | Target drone, operated by Anti-aircraft Artillery Regiment No. 1. |
| DJI Mavic PRO | ? | 2018 | | China | Seen in use by Portuguese Paratroopers and Madeira Military Operational Command. Number of units purchased unknown. |
| AeroVironment RQ-11 Raven | 36 | 2019 | | USA | 36 aircraft or twelve systems (together with associated services and equipment) were purchased through the NSPA on 20 August 2018. |
| SenseFly eBee X | ? | 2020 | | Switzerland | Used by the Army Geospatial Information Center for mapping missions. |
| DJI Matrice 300 RTK | ? | 2020 | | China | Used by Madeira Military Operational Command for surveillance. Madeira Military Operational Command also plans to acquire a long-range drone. Number of units purchased unknown. |
| MyFlyDream Nimbus Tricopter 1800 | ? | 2020 | | China | Unmanned aerial vehicle with VTOL capacity, used by Anti-aircraft Artillery Regiment No. 1. Number of units purchased unknown. |
| Parrot ANAFI | 2 | 2022 | | France | Used by Special Operations Troops Centre. |
| MicroUAV | ? | 2022 | | ? | Seen in use with the Garrison Regiment Nº3. |
| Autel EVO II Dual 640T Enterprise V2 | ? | 2023 | | Chnia | Seen in use for the first time in 2023. |
| Beyond Vision BVQ418 | ? | 2024 | | Portugal | Smart Quadcopter with Thethered Capabilities |
| Sikorsky UH-60 Black Hawk | 3 | 2026 | | USA | Ordered 3 units in 2025. |

== National Republican Guard ==
| Aircraft | Qty | In service | Retired | Origin | Notes |
|---|---|---|---|---|---|
| Sud Aviation Alouette II | 2 | 1976 | ? | France | Former Portuguese Air Force helicopter. Used for highway patrol. |
| Tekever AR4 | 4 | 2014 | | Portugal | At least 4 units received. |
| DJI Mavic PRO | ? | ? | | China | |
| UAVision UX Spyro | ? | ? | | Portugal | |
| Tekever AR5 | 1 | 2024 | | Portugal | Operated by GNR from Figueira da Foz |

== Naval Aviation ==
The Navy's Aviação Naval (Naval Aviation) was created in 1917. In 1993, the Naval Aviation was reborn with the creation of the Esquadrilha de Helicópteros da Marinha (Navy's Helicopter Squadron), which operates the helicopters that serve on board the Navy's ships.

| Aircraft | Qty | In service | Retired | Origin | Notes |
|---|---|---|---|---|---|
| F.B.A. Type B | 3 | 1917 | 1918 | | |
| Donnet-Denhaut D.D.8 | 18 | 1918 | 1923 | France | Eight left by the French Aeronavale at Aveiro |
| Tellier T.3 | 5 | 1918 | 1928 | | |
| Georges Levy G.L.40HB-2 | 2 | 1918 | ? | France | Left by the French Aeronavale at Aveiro |
| Felixstowe F.3 | 3 | 1920 | 1922 | UK | |
| Curtiss HS-2L | 4 | 1921 | 1931 | USA | Left by the United States Navy at Horta. Started flying in 1923 |
| Fairey IIID/IIID Mk.2 | 6 | 1922 | 1931 | UK | |
| Fokker T.IIIW | 4 | 1924 | 1933 | Netherlands | |
| Avro 504K | 3 | 1925 | 1927 | UK | The first wheel aircraft |
| CAMS 37A | 8 | 1927 | 1935 | | |
| Hanriot H.41H | 8 | 1927 | 1935 | | |
| Macchi M.18 | 9 | 1928 | 1934 | | |
| de Havilland DH-60HG Gipsy Moth | 8 | 1929 | 1942 | UK | Bought four directly from de Havilland. Other four were built from parts after the loss of the first four in accidents |
| Fleet F-10 | 26 | 1933 | 1953 | | Several batches |
| Fleet F-10B | 26 | 1933 | 1953 | | Several batches |
| Fleet F-10G | 26 | 1933 | 1953 | | Several batches |
| Junkers K 43W | 5 | 1933 | 1941 | Germany; Sweden | Manufactured in Sweden |
| Hawker Osprey III | 8 | 1935 | 1942 | UK | |
| Blackburn Shark IIA | 6 | 1936 | 1938 | UK | |
| General Aircraft Monospar S.T.12 | 1 | 1936 | 1943 | | |
| Avro 626 | 12 | 1939 | 1950 | UK | |
| Grumman G-21B Goose | 12 | 1940 | 1952 | USA | Transferred to PoAF |
| Grumman G-44 Widgeon | 12 | 1941 | 1952 | USA | Transferred to PoAF |
| Short Sunderland I | 1 | 1941 | 1944 | UK | Interned after force landing in Portugal due to storm |
| Fleet 16 | 5 | 1942 | ? | UK | |
| Miles Martinet T.T.I | 4 | 1943 | 1952 | UK | Transferred to PoAF |
| Airspeed Oxford II | 12 | 1943 | 1952 | UK | Transferred to PoAF |
| Bristol Blenheim IVF | 12 | 1943 | ? | UK | |
| de Havilland DH-82A Tiger Moth | 30 | 1943 | 1952 | UK | Transferred to PoAF |
| Bristol Beaufighter TF.X | 17 | 1945 | 1946 | UK | |
| Beechcraft AT-11 Kansan | 7 | 1947 | 1952 | USA | Transferred to PoAF |
| Beechcraft D-18S | 5 | 1948 | 1952 | USA | Transferred to PoAF |
| North American SNJ-4 | 8 | 1950 | 1952 | USA | Transferred to PoAF |
| Curtiss SB2C-4 Helldiver | 14 | 1950 | 1952 | USA | Used only for spares |
| Curtiss SB2C-5 Helldiver | 24 | 1950 | 1952 | USA | Transferred to PoAF |
| AgustaWestland Super Lynx Mk.95A | 5 | 1993 | | UK | The first aircraft of the recreated Naval Aviation |
| Tekever AR4 | ? | 2014 | | Portugal | Given to the Navy by its manufacturer to improve its development |
| Tekever AR3 | ? | 2015 | | Portugal | In service with the Portuguese Navy at least since 2015 |
| UAVision OGASSA OGS42 V | 2 | 2020 | | Portugal | Acquired two units to be operated from Frigates and Offshore patrol vessels |
| UAVision UX Spyro | 4 | 2020 | | Portugal | Purchased at least 4 units to be operated from Frigates and Offshore patrol vessels. Designate Açor-class |
| Beyond Vision VTOne | 6 | 2023 | | Portugal | Acquired 6 units in early 2023 |
| Beyond Vision HEIFU | 6 | 2023 | | Portugal | Acquired 6 units in early 2023 |
| Autel EVO II Dual 640T Enterprise V2 | ? | 2023 | | China | Seen in use for the first time in 2023. |
| AeroVironment RQ-20 Puma | ? | 2024 | | USA | In service since 2024 |

== Military Aeronautics ==
The Army's Aeronáutica Militar (Military Aeronautics) was the first military aviation service created in Portugal and much of the Portuguese aviation origins date back to it.

| Aircraft | Qty | In service | Retired | Origin | Notes |
|---|---|---|---|---|---|
| Maurice Farman Type 1911-1912 | 1 | 1912 | 1916 | France | |
| Deperdussin Type B | 1 | 1912 | 1916 | France | |
| Maurice Farman MF-11 | 3 | 1912 | 1917 | France | |
| Farman F.40 | 5 | 1916 | 1920 | France | |
| Morane-Saulnier H | 1 | 1916 | ? | France | |
| Caudron G.III | 58 | 1916 | ? | France; Portugal | 50 built from 1922 at Alverca |
| Nieuport Ni.83 | 7 | 1917 | ? | France | |
| Caudron G.IV | 9 | 1918 | 1923 | France | |
| Breguet 14 A.2 | 28 | 1919 | ? | France | |
| Breguet 14 T.2 | 1 | 1919 | ? | France | |
| SPAD S.VII C.1 | 12 | 1919 | 1935 | France | More units possibly received |
| Martinsyde F-4 Buzzard | 4 | 1919 | 1933 | UK | |
| Nieuport Ni.21 | 8 | 1920 | ? | France | |
| Nieuport Ni.80 | 3 | 1920 | ? | France | |
| Breguet 16 Bn.2 | 1 | 1921 | ? | France | |
| Vickers Valparaiso II | 4 | 1923 | 1933 | UK | |
| Vickers Valparaiso I | 10 | 1924 | 1933 | UK | |
| Caudron C.59 | 1 | 1924 | ? | France | |
| Fairey IIID | 1 | 1924 | 1925 | UK | |
| Avro 548 AX Airdisco | 2 | 1924 | 1933 | UK | |
| Avro 504K | 27 | 1924 | 1937 | UK | |
| Dornier Wal | 1 | 1927 | ? | Germany | |
| Potez 25 Bidon | 1 | 1928 | 1937 | France | |
| Potez 25 A.2 | 35 | 1931 | 1943 | France | |
| Junkers W 34L | 1 | 1928 | 1936 | Germany | |
| Farman F.191 | 1 | 1929 | 1934 | France | |
| Morane-Saulnier MS.130 | 1 | 1931 | ? | France | |
| Morane-Saulnier MS.133 | 4 | 1931 | ? | France | |
| Morane-Saulnier MS.233 | 15 | 1931 | ? | France | Built under license |
| Junkers A50Ce Junior | 1 | 1931 | 1940 | Germany | |
| Vickers Valparaiso III | 13 | 1933 | 1943 | UK | Built under license |
| de Havilland DH.82 Tiger Moth | 11 | 1934 | 1952 | UK; Portugal | Small number of airframes built under license in Alverca; Transferred to PoAF |
| de Havilland DH.82A Tiger Moth | 9 | 1934 | 1952 | UK; Portugal | Small number of airframes built under license in Alverca; Transferred to PoAF |
| de Havilland DH.85 Leopard Moth | 1 | 1934 | ? | UK | Aircraft named "Dilly", did Lisbon-Timor-Macau-India-Lisbon flight on December 25, 1934 |
| Avro 631 Cadet | 1 | 1934 | 1952 | UK | |
| Caproni Ca.100 Caproncino | 1 | 1934 | 1940 | Italy | |
| Caproni Ca.113 Farfalla | 1 | 1934 | 1939 | Italy | |
| Hawker Fury I | 3 | 1934 | 1945 | UK | |
| Avro 626 Tutor | 31 | 1936 | 1952 | UK | |
| Junkers Ju 52 | 12 | 1936 | 1952 | Germany | Transferred to PoAF |
| Junkers Ju 52/3 mg3e | 12 | 1936 | 1952 | Germany | Transferred to PoAF |
| de Havilland DH.84 Dragon | 3 | 1937 | ? | UK | |
| Hawker Hind | 4 | 1937 | ? | UK | |
| de Havilland DH.88 Comet | 1 | 1937 | ? | UK | Reregistered CS-AAJ Salazar |
| Junkers Ju 86K-7 | 10 | 1938 | 1948 | Germany | |
| Gloster Gladiator II | 30 | 1938 | 1952 | UK | |
| Breda Ba.65Bis | 10 | 1939 | 1941 | Italy | |
| Curtiss 75A-4 Mohawk | 17 | 1941 | 1945 | USA | |
| Miles Master II/III | 13 | 1941 | 1958 | UK | |
| Miles Martinet T.T.I | 7 | 1942 | ? | UK | |
| Lockheed P-38F Lightning | 2 | 1942 | 1945 | USA | Interned during WWII after an emergency landing in Lisbon |
| Lockheed P-38G Lightning | 2 | 1942 | 1945 | USA | Interned during WWII after an emergency landing in Lisbon |
| Supermarine Spitfire I | 18 | 1942 | 1948 | UK | |
| Supermarine Spitfire VB | 93 | 1943 | 1952 | UK | Transferred to PoAF |
| Bell P-400 Airacobra | 15 | 1942 | 1950 | USA | Interned during WWII |
| Bell P-39L Airacobra | 4 | 1942 | 1950 | USA | Interned during WWII |
| Consolidated B-24/PB4Y-1 Liberator | 6 | 1943 | ? | USA | Interned during WWII |
| Douglas C-47 Dakota | 1 | 1944 | 1952 | USA | Interned during WWII. Transferred to PoAF |
| de Havilland Hornet Moth | 1 | 1943 | ? | UK | |
| Bristol Blenheim IV | 10 | 1943 | 1947 | UK | |
| Bristol Blenheim V | 3 | 1943 | 1947 | UK | |
| Lockheed Hudson III/VI | 3 | 1943 | ? | USA | Interned during WWII |
| Hawker Hurricane IIB/IIC | 142 | 1943 | 1954 | UK | |
| Westland Lysander IIIA | 13 | 1943 | 1952 | UK | |
| Vickers Wellington X | 1 | 1943 | ? | UK | Interned during WWII |
| Airspeed Oxford | 19 | 1943 | 1952 | UK | Transferred to PoAF |
| Miles Magister I | 10 | 1946 | 1952 | UK | Transferred to PoAF |
| Beechcraft Bonanza | 1 | 1947 | ? | USA | |
| Avro Anson T.1 | 10 | 1947 | 1952 | UK | Transferred to PoAF |
| North American AT-6A Texan | 48 | 1947 | 1952 | USA | Transferred to PoAF |
| North American AT-6B Texan | 48 | 1947 | 1952 | USA | Transferred to PoAF |
| North American AT-6C Texan | 48 | 1947 | 1952 | USA | Transferred to PoAF |
| North American AT-6G Texan | 48 | 1947 | 1952 | USA | Transferred to PoAF |
| Boeing SB-17G Flying Fortress | 5 | 1947 | 1960 | USA | Transferred to PoAF |
| Douglas C-54 Skymaster | 9 | 1947 | 1978 | USA | Transferred to PoAF |
| Douglas SC-54/HC-54 Searchmaster | 9 | 1947 | ? | USA | 3 used for spares |
| de Havilland DH.89A Dragon Rapide | 1 | 1950 | 1952 | UK | Transferred to PoAF |
| de Havilland Canada DHC-1 Chipmunk | 10 | 1951 | 1952 | UK | Transferred to PoAF |
| Piper PA-18/L-21 B Super Cub | 22 | 1952 | 1955 | USA | Used by Army artillery for observation, already after dissolution of the Army Aviation and the creation of the PoAF in 1952. Transferred to PoAF only in 1955 |

== See also ==
- Portuguese military aircraft serials
- Portuguese Naval Aviation
- Portuguese Air Force
- Portuguese Colonial War
- OGMA
- UALE
