= Portuguese Naval Aviation =

Air component of the Portuguese Navy from 1917 to 1957

Navy's Helicopter Squadron
- Esquadrilha de Helicópteros da Marinha
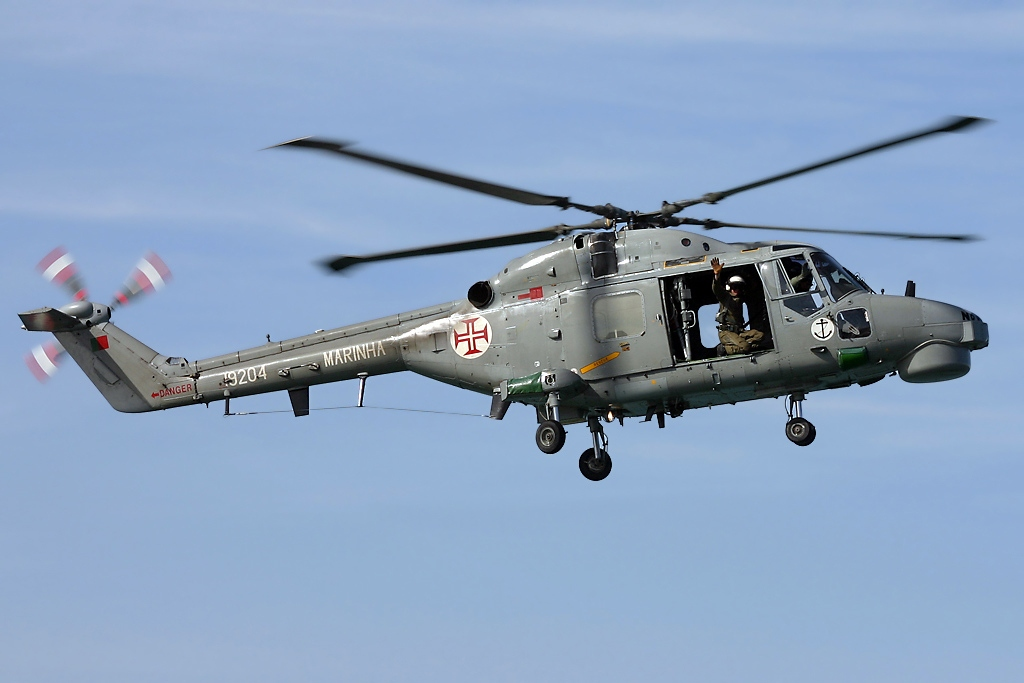
- A Portuguese Navy Lynx helicopter
- Active: 28 September 1917 — 1952; 2 June 1993
- Country: Portugal
- Branch: Navy
- Type: Naval aviation
- Role: Anti-submarine warfare, Anti-surface warfare, maritime interdiction
- Size: 130 personnel
- Part of: Flotilha (FLOTNAV)
- Garrison/HQ: Montijo Air Base

Commanders
- Commander: Capitão-de-fragata Paulo Jorge da Conceição Lopes

Insignia
- Roundel

- Fin flash

Aircraft flown
- Helicopter: AgustaWestland Super Lynx Mk.95

The Portuguese Naval Aviation (Portuguese: Aviação Naval Portuguesa) constituted the air component of the Portuguese Navy, from 1917 to 1957. The Portuguese Air Force maritime patrol units and the Navy's Helicopter Squadron (EHM, Esquadrilha de Helicópteros da Marinha) are the present successors of the former Portuguese Naval Aviation.

Although generically referred as "Naval Aviation", the air component of the Navy was officially successively designated "Navy's Aviation Service" (1917–1918), "Naval Aeronautics Service" (1918–1952) and "Aeronaval Forces" (1952–1958). In 1958, the Aeronaval Forces, which were already part of the Air Force - although still under the Navy's operational control and operated by naval personnel - were disbanded and its assets fully integrated in the Portuguese Air Force.

In 1993, an air component was reactivated in the Portuguese Navy, in the form of the Navy's Helicopter Squadron, to operate its new shipborne helicopters entering service with the Vasco da Gama-class frigates. The remaining aviation activities which were once performed by the Naval Aviation, including the maritime air patrol, anti-surface warfare and air-sea rescue, continue however to be performed by the Portuguese Air Force.

== History ==
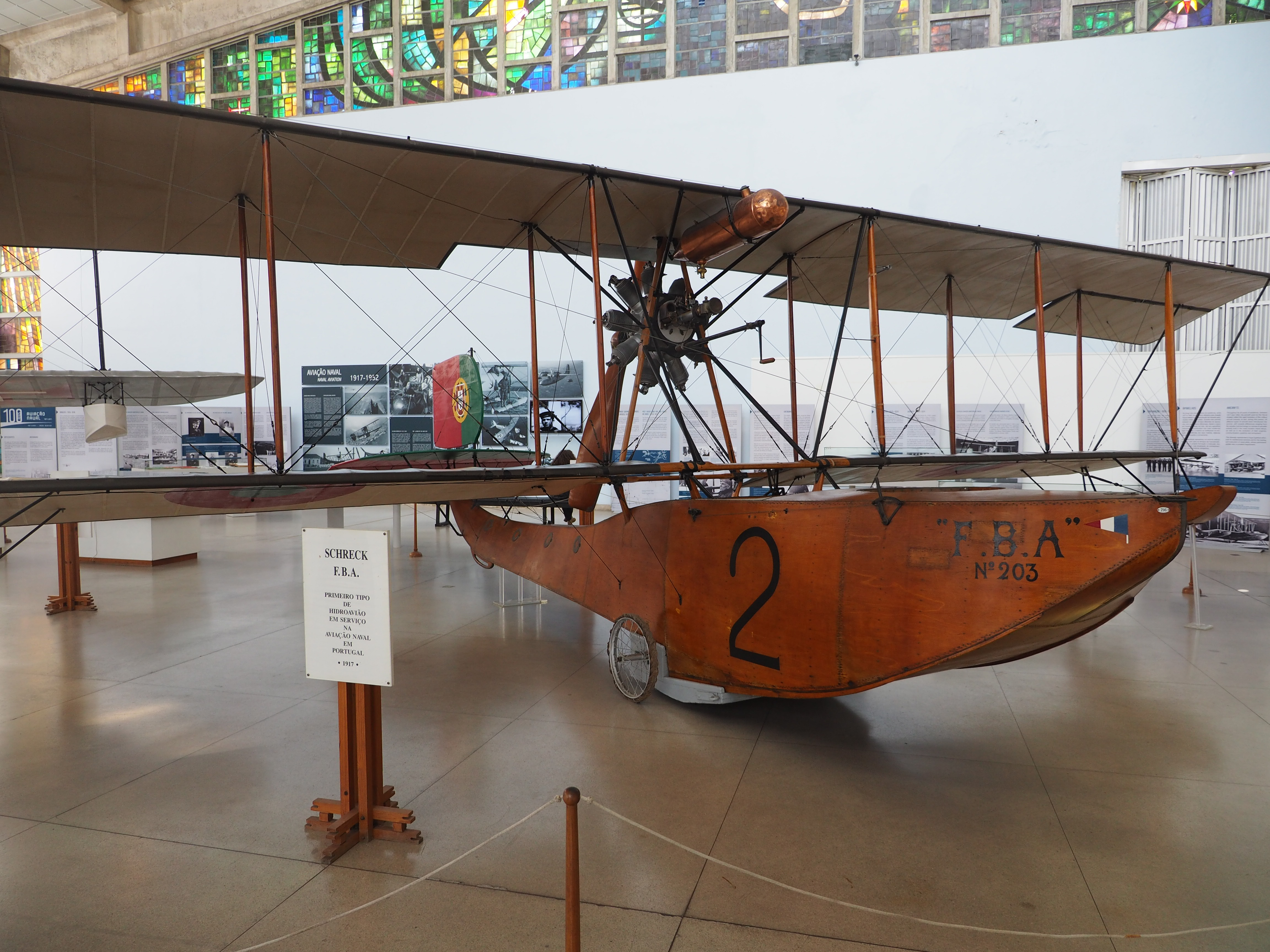
FBA Type B seaplane, the first aircraft of the Portuguese Naval Aviation

The origins of the Portuguese Naval Aviation date back to 1916, when two Navy officers were sent to France to undergo flight training as part of a larger effort started in 1913 to create a military aviation school capable of serving as the basis for the creation of both the Army's and Navy's aviation services. These two Navy officers — 1TEN Artur de Sacadura Cabral and GMAR AN António Joaquim Caseiro — underwent basic flight training at Chartres and flying boat flight training at Saint-Raphaël, Var.

During Sacadura Cabral's stay in France, he was also appointed by the Navy Ministry to establish contact with the French aviation industry to study the existing hydroplane models to equip a future Portuguese naval air service.

Upon their return, both were appointed flight instructors at the Military Aviation School of Vila Nova da Rainha (Portuguese: Escola de Aviação Militar de Vila Nova da Rainha), the navy's section of the Army's School of Military Aeronautics (Portuguese: Escola de Aeronáutica Militar, EAM), with Sacadura Cabral being appointed instruction director. Meanwhile, Navy personnel started receiving flight training and aircraft maintenance instruction at the school and abroad, in France.

Also upon his return to Portugal, Sacadura Cabral was asked by the War Minister to designate an appropriate location for a future hydroplane naval air station, which later became the Bom Sucesso Naval Air Station (Portuguese: Centro de Aviação Naval do Bom Sucesso).

In late 1916, due to the threat posed by the submarines of the Imperial German Navy to the merchant ships sailing along the Portuguese coast during World War I, the French government asked Portugal permission to install a naval air station in Portugal. 1st Lieutenant Maurice Larrouy, of the French Navy, elaborated a study which proposed the installation of an airship and hydroplane base in Lisbon, and two additional hydroplane bases in the north and south of Portugal. However, due to the logistics costs of operating airships, Sacadura Cabral opposed the plan of installing an airship base in Lisbon and instead the decision was made to equip Bom Sucesso with anti-submarine flying boats and to build a hydroplane base for the French Naval Aviation in Aveiro.

=== Creation of the Navy's Aviation Service ===
On 28 September 1917 the Navy's Aviation Service (Portuguese: Serviço de Aviação da Armada) was created with its personnel, material and aviation school being separated from the Army's EAM. The service was then installed at the Bom Sucesso Naval Air Station in the Lisbon docks.

Two F.B.A. flying boats, received in March 1917 and stored at EAM, arrived at Bom Sucesso by December 1917, marking the beginning of the Navy's independent flight operations.

For the centennial, on 28 September 2017, citizens and tourists near the Torre de Belém in Lisbon were treated to a short afternoon air show of planes and helicopter over the Tagus River plus an anniversary ceremony on the riverbank including a military band.

=== Naval Aeronautics Service ===
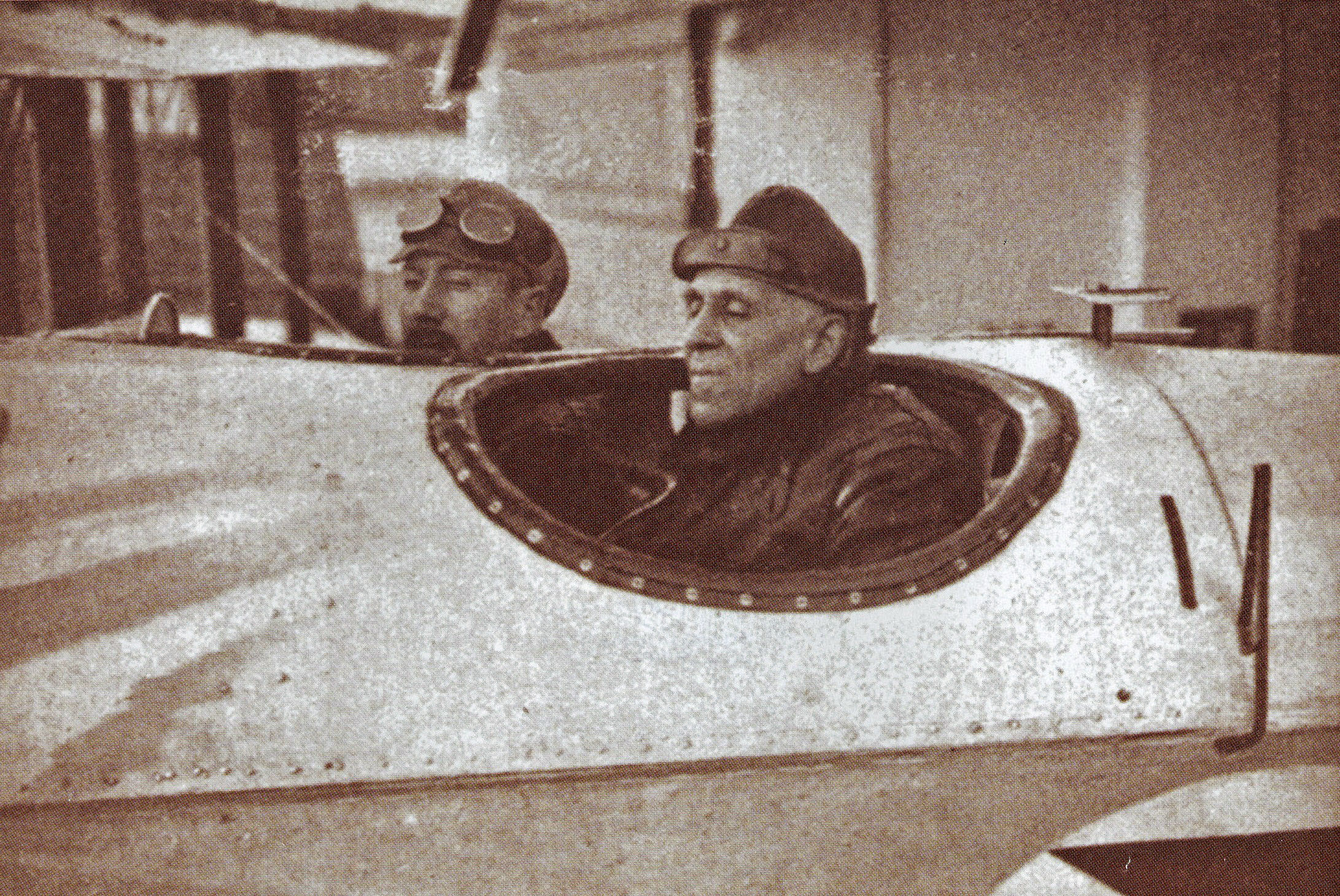
Lieutenant-Commander Sacadura Cabral and Captain Gago Coutinho in the cockpit of the Fairey III seaplane Lusitânia, at the departure for the first aerial crossing of the South Atlantic

On 5 January 1918 the naval aviation was renamed to Naval Aeronautics Service (Portuguese: Serviço da Aeronáutica Naval).

In April 1918 the first flying boats of the French Navy arrived at São Jacinto, in Aveiro. Together with the Portuguese aircraft at Bom Sucesso naval air station, this allowed them to perform anti-submarine patrols and cover the coastal Portuguese waters and the main ports.

This same year the United States Navy started operating Curtiss HS-2L hydroplanes from Horta, Faial Island.

With the end of the war the French Navy left São Jacinto and handed over the naval air station to the Portuguese Navy as well as 18 Donnet-Denhaut D.D.8 and two Georges Levy G.L.40 flying boats as a gift. On 28 December 1918 a Portuguese Navy officer took command of the São Jacinto Naval Air Station (Portuguese: Centro de Aviação Naval de S. Jacinto).

The United States Navy left as well their base at Horta and offered to the Portuguese Navy four Curtis HS-2L. These aircraft were transported and ship to Lisbon and started operating from Bom Sucesso in 1923.

In 1919 aircraft of the Portuguese Naval Aviation operating from São Jacinto were used against the pro-monarch movement Monarchy of the North, during the political instability in Portugal that resulted from the assassination of President Sidónio Pais.

The first documented use of Portuguese aircraft from ships was in 1922, during the First aerial crossing of the South Atlantic, when after an accident in Saint Peter and Saint Paul Archipelago the aircraft used by the Portuguese aviators was embarked into the Brazilian civilian ship Bagé and transported back to Lisbon.

In April 1931, following an attempted military takeover in Funchal, Madeira, the Portuguese government declares martial law in Madeira and in the Azores. Four CAMS 37A of the Naval Aviation were then sent on 11 April to Horta, Azores, by ship to perform reconnaissance, ground attack, and psychological warfare missions against the local revolting forces. These aircraft flew 100 hours and were hit by small arms fire and fireworks converted into rudimentary anti-aircraft rockets. Nevertheless, no aircraft were lost and all returned to Lisbon by the end of the hostilities.

At this time, the Magalhães Corrêa naval modernization program (Portuguese: Plano Naval Magalhães Corrêa) included the purchase of a seaplane tender that was order from Italy in 1931. However, as consequence of the 1929 economic crisis, the value of the Lira collapsed and the increase of the acquisition costs led to the contract being canceled. Nevertheless, as part of the modernization program two 1st class avisos of the Afonso de Albuquerque type were built with the capacity to carry a floatplane, Hawker Osprey III. These aircraft were mostly used in reconnaissance and training and by the 1940s it was decided that they added did not add any further capabilities to the ship and their facilities were replaced on the ships by anti-aircraft artillery.

=== Reorganization of the Naval Aeronautics Service ===
On 30 September 1936 the Naval Aeronautics Service suffered a deep reorganization. Its operational component became the Navy's Air Forces (FAA, Forças Aéreas da Armada), which was foreseen to include permanent and reserve naval aeronautical forces. It was organized in flights, each including from six to 12 single-engine or from three to five multi-engine aircraft of the same type. The flights could be subdivided in sections and grouped in groups of flights. Besides the Navy's Air Forces, the Naval Aeronautics Service also included the Directory of the Naval Aeronautics and the naval aeronautics establishments (naval air stations, naval air posts and the Admiral Gago Coutinho Naval Aviation School).

Between 1939 and 1940 Avro 626 equipped with floats, and Grumman G-21B Goose were bought. During its service, the Grumman Goose established regular transport between continental Portugal to the Azores and performed search and rescue missions.

In February 1941, a Short Sunderland was interned after being forced to land on the Portuguese coast, during a flight from the United Kingdom to Gibraltar, due to high winds.

That same year, twenty de Havilland DH-82A Tiger Moth were transferred to the Portuguese Navy from a large batch bought by the Portuguese government and also received from the UK as compensation for the use of the aviation facilities in Azores. These aircraft were found to be more economical for the flight training of new pilots, as most training accidents with float-planes resulted in the total loss of the airframe, and allowed to improve and expand the training at the "Almirante Gago Coutinho" Naval Aviation School, in Aveiro.

In 1943, the Naval Aviation received former-Royal Air Force Bristol Blenheim bombers, while these aircraft had already been used extensively in combat, they were equipped with modern avionics and communication equipment which allowed the Portuguese Navy to familiarize their personnel with more modern combat aircraft. 12 Airspeed Oxford for flight and navigation training were also transferred to the Naval Aviation as part of the use of the aviation facilities in Azores by the UK. The first six aircraft were delivered in 1943 but the remaining aircraft were only delivered in 1947, after the end of the war.

In 1945, a batch of Bristol Beaufighter TF.X were received also as part of the deal for the use of the Azores by the British during World War II. These aircraft improved greatly the combat capacity of the Naval Aviation but due to high maintenance costs were shortly after retired, with many aircraft still having many flight hours left.

After the war Beechcraft AT-11 Kansan and Beechcraft D-18S aircraft were acquired as surplus aircraft from the United States Navy. These aircraft served mostly in the connection between the continent, Azores, Cape Verde, and Portuguese Guinea.

The last major acquisition of combat aircraft by the Naval Aviation was in 1950, when several Curtiss SB2C Helldiver dive bombers were bought from the United States through the Mutual Defense Assistance Act. These aircraft equipped a new anti-submarine squadron based at São Jacinto, in Aveiro.

In 1951, the Naval Aviation tested, at the Lisbon Naval Aviation Centre, a civilian Westland WS-51 Dragonfly Mk.1A for possible shipborne operations. This helicopter was later sold to Italy and later served in the Italian Air Force with the tail number MM80118I.

=== Aeronaval Forces ===
With the unification of the Army and Navy's military aviation services by the Under-Secretary of State for the Aeronautics (Portuguese: Subsecretariado de Estado da Aeronáutica), the Portuguese Air Force (Portuguese: Força Aérea Portuguesa (FAP)) was created in 1952 and all Naval Aviation assets were transferred to this new branch. However, the naval aviation's units formed inside the Air Force a semi-independent branch for operational and training purposes designated Aeronaval Forces (Portuguese: Forças Aeronavais). By 1958, with the anti-submarine and maritime patrol squadrons completely integrated into the Air Force, the Naval Aviation was finally disbanded and its last remaining technicians and officers returned to the Navy.

=== Fully integration in the Air Force ===
Between 1958 (when it integrated the Army Light Aviation and the Aeronaval Forces assets) and 1993, the Portuguese Air Force (FAP) maintained the monopoly of the military aviation activities in Portugal, including those which were once performed by the Naval Aviation. The former Montijo Naval Air Station (now the Montijo Air Force Base) continued to concentrate the maritime aviation assets, namely the maritime patrol aircraft.

In 1964, in the Guinean theatre of the Portuguese Overseas War, a FAP Alouette II made what is considered the first helicopter operation from a Portuguese Navy ship, by performing personnel transport and medical evacuation missions from a wooden platform constructed on the frigate Nuno Tristão. Later in the war other helicopter medical evacuations were made by FAP helicopters to the support ship Sam Brás.

During and after the war Alouette III helicopters operated on the flight decks of the João Coutinho-class and Baptista de Andrade-class corvettes and the support ship São Gabriel. In 1987, upon the modernization of the João Belo-class frigates, it was considered equipping them with a flight deck and a telescopic hangar to enable them to carry an organic anti-submarine helicopter. However, the modernization program continued without making these changes to the ships.

=== Navy's Helicopter Squadron ===
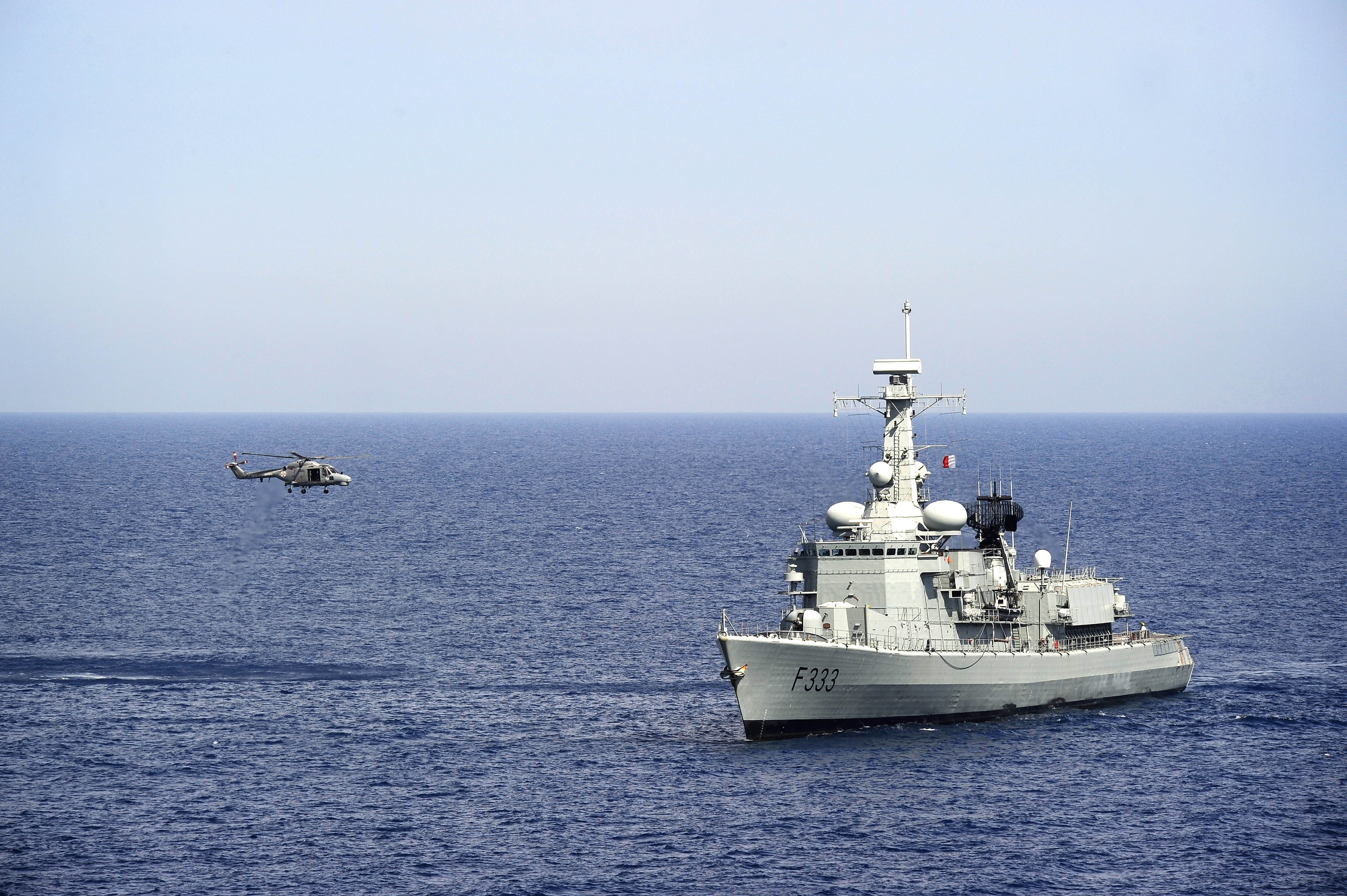
A Portuguese Navy Lynx prepares to land aboard the frigate Bartolomeu Dias

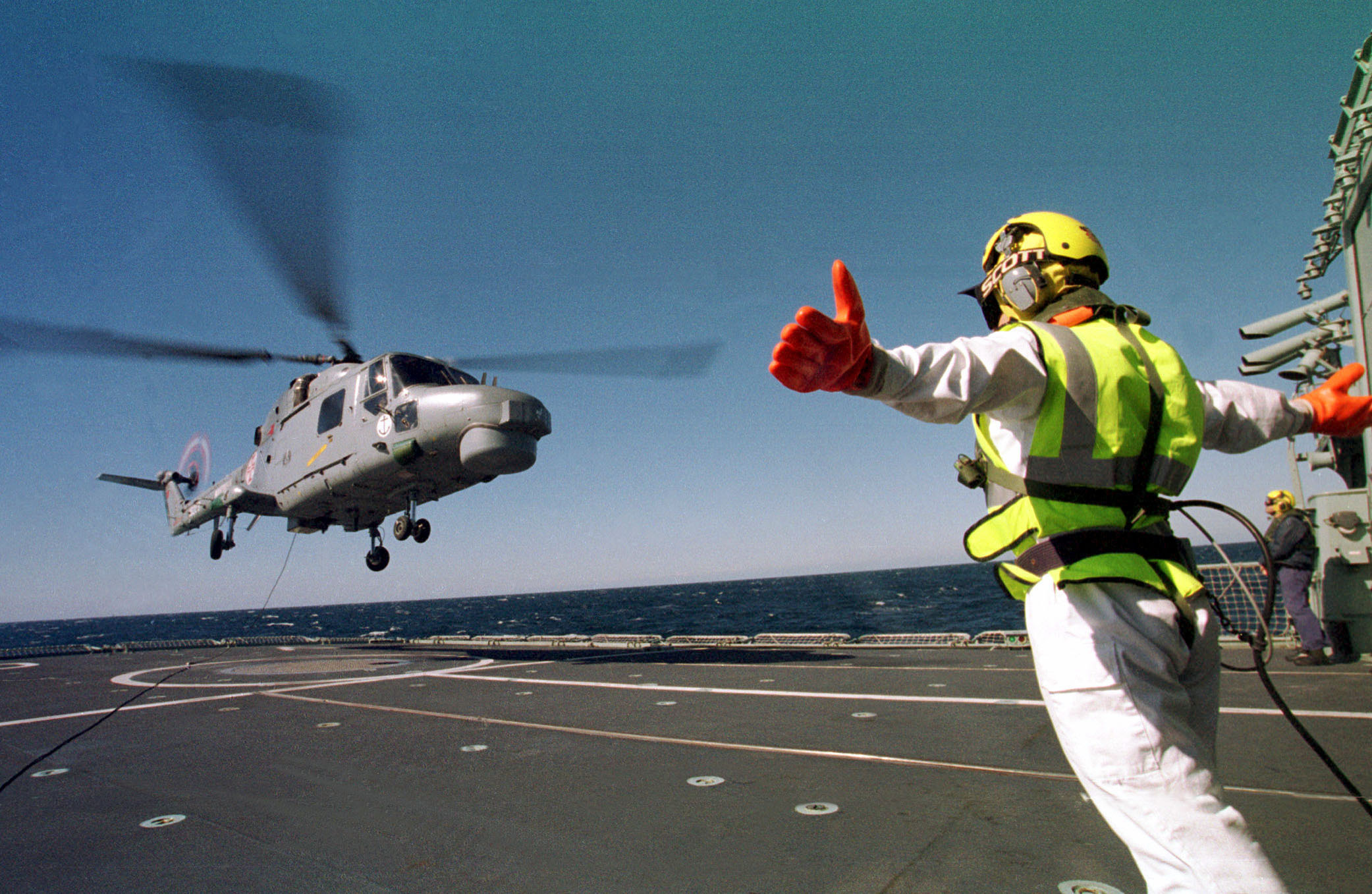
A Portuguese Navy Lynx helicopter takes off from the flight deck of the frigate NRP Vasco da Gama

The Navy's Helicopter Squadron (Portuguese: Esquadrilha de Helicópteros da Marinha, EHM) was created as part of the Navy's acquisition program of the new Vasco da Gama-class frigates, which included a helicopter as an anti-submarine warfare system.

In 1977, with the need to replace older ships in its fleet, the Portuguese Navy created a work group (Portuguese: Grupo de Trabalho de Actualização dos Meios Navais) to study the purchase of new ships, including new frigates. This work group also proposed the acquisition of helicopters to equip the new frigates. However, mostly due to lack of funds, a decision wasn't made to acquire new equipment.

Finally in the middle of the 1980s, with the continuation of the Cold War and the need to modernize the naval fleet, a decision was made to purchase new frigates with the capacity to operate helicopters. At the end of the decade of 1980, the Navy started evaluating both the Kaman SH-2 Seasprite and Westland Lynx as the frigate's on-board helicopters. In August 1988 a group of officers were sent to Plymouth, United Kingdom to undergo the Air Engineer Application Course, at the Royal Naval Engineering College, to start receiving training in aerodynamics, shipborne aeronautical systems, engine maintenance, and the control and certification of all maintenance procedures. In April 1989 the officers continued their training at HMS Daedalus, and later were divided into two groups and sent to receive their certifications at 829 Naval Air Squadron and 715 Naval Air Squadron of the Royal Navy's Fleet Air Arm.

Having returned to Portugal in October 1989, the officers that underwent training in the United Kingdom integrated a new work group for the acquisition of the naval helicopters (Portuguese: Grupo de Trabalho para a Aquisição dos Helicópteros, GTAH). In December 1989 the final decision was made to acquire five Westland Super Lynx Mk.95 helicopters.

The Navy's Helicopter Squadron was officially created on 2 June 1993, with the mission of training the helicopter maintenance personnel and on-board helicopter operations crews, support the flotilla, naval units and embarked helicopter detachments, and maintain two helicopter detachments. The squadron was activated on 8 June 1993 and was based at the Montijo Air Base, with its facilities being inaugurated on 24 September that year and the first two helicopters having been delivered on 29 July.

In 1995, the first helicopter detachment was formed and started on-board operations. Currently, the Naval Aviation operates the Lynx helicopters from the Vasco da Gama-class and Bartolomeu Dias-class frigates.

Since the reactivation of the Naval Aviation it was decided to use the available Air Force's logistics and training infrastructure to reduce costs and improve the overall unit performance. As such, officers are selected from the Naval School and then undergo flight training at the Air Force on the Aérospatiale Epsilon TB-30 with 101 Squadron and later on the Aérospatiale Alouette III with 552 Squadron. Having completed their flight training in the Air Force, the naval pilots return to the Navy to start their operational conversion to the Lynx helicopter at the Helicopter Instruction Center (Portuguese: Centro de Instrução de Helicópteros, CIH) of the EHM.

In addition to training both flight pilots (Portuguese: Piloto de voo) and tactical pilots (Portuguese: Piloto táctico, co-pilot and observer), the CIH also gives instruction to maintenance personnel and system's operators — sonar, winch operator, and rescue swimmer. As part of its helicopter training the Navy also has a partnership with the Joint Lynx Simulator Training Establishment (JLSTE) for the use of a Lynx helicopter simulator located at the Maritime Aviation Site De Kooy, in the Netherlands.

== Aircraft inventory ==
The Naval Aviation uses the same designation system for its aircraft as the FAP.

- 3 × (United Kingdom) AgustaWestland Super Lynx Mk.95 (originally 5).
- 6 × (Portugal) Beyond Vision VTOne.
- 6 × (Portugal) Beyond Vision HEIFU.
- 4 × (Portugal) UAVision UX Spyro;
- 2 × (Portugal) UAVision Ogassa OGS42/V;
- ? × (Portugal) Tekever AR3;
- ? × (Portugal) Tekever AR4.
- ? × (Portugal) X-1001.
- ? × (China) Autel EVO II Dual 640T Enterprise V2

== Historical bases and units ==
=== Naval air bases ===
- Lisbon Naval Air Station (CAN Lisboa, Portuguese: Centro de Aviação Naval de Lisboa): created in 1917 as a seaplane base located at the Bom Sucesso Docks, being the first operational naval aviation base. On 2 January 1953 it was transferred to newly built facilities located at Montijo which, besides a seaplane base, included an airfield, becoming officially the "Sacadura Cabral" Naval Air Station. It was renamed "Air Base No. 6" on 12 June 1954.
- Aveiro Naval Air Station (CAN Aveiro, Centro de Aviação Naval de Aveiro): was activated in 1918 at the São Jacinto península, during World War I, as a base for anti-submarine seaplanes operated by the French Navy with the support of Portuguese land crews. In that same year, it started to be operated by the Portuguese Navy. Later an airfield was constructed and in 1953 it was converted into a Portuguese Air Force base.
- Azores Naval Air Station (CAN Açores, Centro de Aviação Naval dos Açores): seaplane base installed in 1918 in Horta during World War I. In 1919, it was transferred to Ponta Delgada, being deactivated in 1921. The base was reactivated in 1941 during World War II being definitely deactivated in 1946.
- Algarve Naval Air Station (CAN Algarve, Centro de Aviação Naval do Algarve): seaplane base constructed in 1918, at the Culatra Island, on the coast of Faro and Olhão, during World War I, to operate anti-submarine flying boats. Although its hangars and main infrastructures were built, supporting occasional deployments of seaplanes, it was never officially activated. Its facilities served later to support the naval fire range installed in the area, which was deactivated in the middle 1990s.
- Macau Naval Air Station (CAN Macau, Centro de Aviação Naval de Macau): seaplane base installed at the Taipa island in 1927 to support the Portuguese naval forces which were combating the piracy on the seas of China, in the period of the Chinese Civil War. The air station was deactivated in 1933 but was reactivated in 1937, by occasion of the Second Sino-Japanese War. In 1940, it was transferred to the new facilities constructed at the Exterior Port of Macau. In 1942 it was definitely deactivated.

=== Other naval air units ===
- Military Aeronautics School (Escola de Aeronáutica Militar): joint Army-Navy unit created in 1914, at Vila Nova da Rainha, Azambuja municipality to train crew members for the developing Portuguese military aviation. It included a Navy Section which came to integrate the initial aircraft of the Portuguese Navy. The school would be latter became fully part of the Army and be transferred to Sintra.
- "Admiral Gago Coutinho" Naval Aviation School (Escola de Aviação Naval "Almirante Gago Coutinho"): activated in 1928 to allow the complete training of the Naval Aviation personnel, which instruction was, until then, partially done in foreign aviation schools. It was installed at the Aveiro Naval Air Station facilities until 1952.
- B Squadron of the Navy Air Forces (Esquadrilha B das Forças Aéreas da Armada): shore based naval attack bomber unit, initially equipped with Bristol Blenheim bombers and then with Bristol Beaufighter torpedo bombers, activated in 1942 and deactivated in 1949. Although dependent from the Lisbon Naval Air Station, it was permanently deployed at the Lisbon Airport.

== See also ==
- Aerial warfare
- Anti-submarine warfare
- Military of Macau under Portuguese rule
- List of aircraft of the Portuguese Air Force
- Naval aviation
- Portuguese Air Force
- Portuguese Navy
