= SNETA =

Airline in Belgium (1919–1923)

The National Syndicate for the Study of Aerial Transport (French: Syndicat national d'Etude des Transports Aériens), known by its acronym SNETA, was an early airline which operated from 1919 to 1923 in order to pioneer commercial aviation in Belgium. In 1923 it ceased operations and merged into the newly founded national carrier SABENA.

== History ==
The company was founded on 31 March 1919 by Georges Nélis with the support of King Albert I. It operated from the airfield at Haren, near Brussels, and flew to London (Hounslow Heath Aerodrome and Croydon Airport), Paris (Paris–Le Bourget Airport) and Amsterdam (Amsterdam Airport Schiphol). Amongst the pilots of SNETA was Ivan Smirnov. Its initial fleet was made up of surplus airplanes from the First World War. The company used a mix of British, French and German planes. The first nine acquired airplanes were:

- 3 Breguet 14
- 3 De Havilland Airco DH.9
- 3 Rumpler C.IV.

Later the company also acquired Farman F.60 Goliaths and Fokker D.VIIs.

In 1921, the company started operating in the Belgian Congo through its subsidiary CENAC (Comité d' Etude pour la Navigation Aérienne du Congo and later as Ligne Aérienne du Roi Albert) flying to Matadi, Léopoldville and Stanleyville using the Lévy-Le Pen.

On 27 September 1921, a wooden hangar burned out, destroying seven of SNETA's 23 airplanes.

By 1 June 1922, enough information was gathered and all experimental flights were suspended. This cleared the way to start up a real Belgian commercial operator, SABENA, which came into being on 23 May 1923 and into which SNETA merged.

== Fleet ==
=== Historical fleet ===
- 3x Bréguet 14
- 6x Airco de Havilland DH.9
- 5x Airco de Havilland DH.4
- 10x Rumpler C.IV
- 1x Luft-Verkehrs Gesellschaft LVG C.IV
- 6x Luft-Verkehrs Gesellschaft LVG C.VI
- 6x Farman F.60 Goliath
- 1x Ansaldo A.300-C
- 6x Blériot-SPAD S.33
- Operated by CENAC: 6x Levy-Le Pen flying boats.
