= Portuguese military aircraft serials =

Identification for Portuguese military aircraft

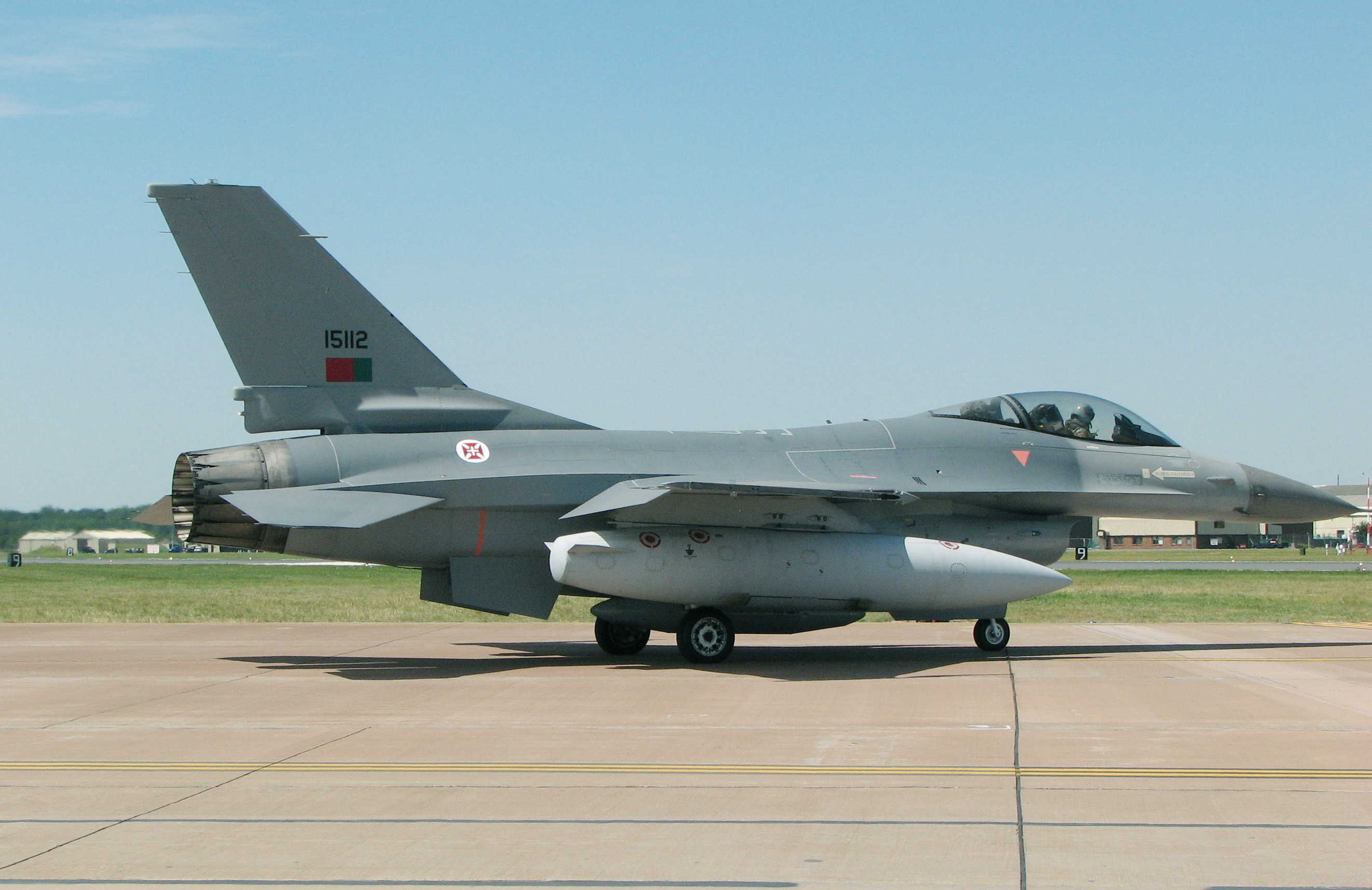
A F-16A OCU fighter, with the serial number 15112, of the Portuguese Air Force at the Royal International Air Tattoo, Fairford, Gloucestershire, England.

In Portugal to identify individual aircraft, all military aircraft are allocated and display a serial number. A common serial number system is used for aircraft operated by the three military branches, the Portuguese Air Force, Portuguese Naval Aviation and Portuguese Army. Individual agencies have each their own system.

Some aircraft that were acquired and offered to Portugal, even before the organization of the military aviation as an entity, never received serials, being only identified by their own names.

== History ==
=== Army Aviation ===
==== Sequential system by aircraft type ====
In 1914, with the foundation of the Escola de Aeronáutica Militar (School of Military Aeronautic) a serial sequential system by aircraft type was implemented. This system consisted in the assignment of a serial number to each aircraft of a certain type. For example, the Caudron G.III received serials from 1, 2, 3 and so on, as well the Farman MF-11 received the designation of MF11-1, MF11-2, and MF11-3. Aircraft that were the single existing example didn't receive serials, i.e. Morane-Saulnier Type H and Breguet 16Bn-2.

==== Block numbering system ====
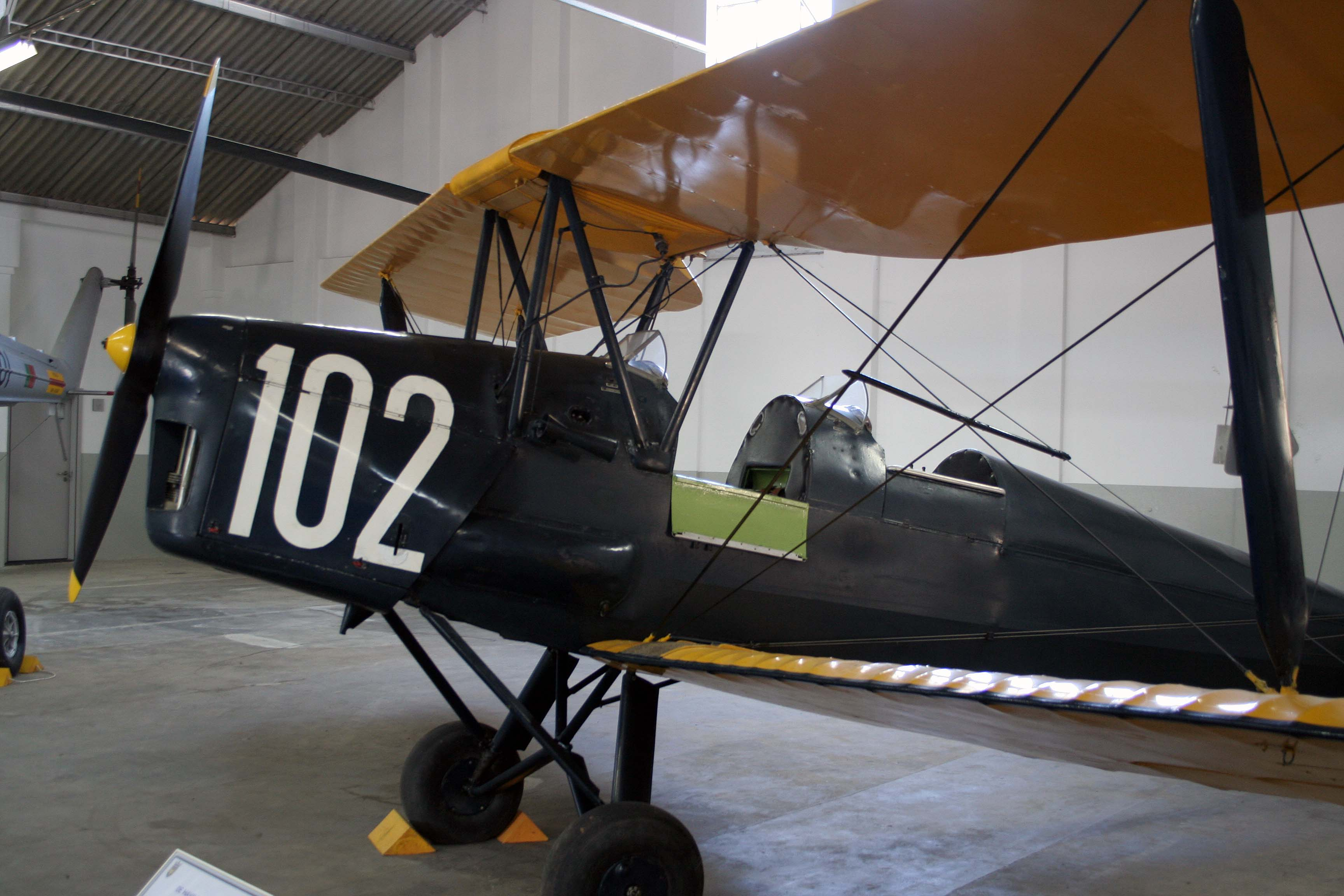
Portuguese De Havilland DH-82 Tiger Moth using the block numbering system

In 1935, with the Administrative Regulation 172 of March 16, 1935 of the 3rd Division of the Direcção da Arma de Aeronáutica (Directorate of the Army Aviation), serials began to be assigned in blocks of numbers with three digits each. The blocks were non-contiguous and were related with the airfield where the aircraft were stationed.

However, this system was not well understood by some air bases which thought that a certain group of serials had been assigned to the airfield and not to the aircraft. For example, on November 12, 1935 when the Moranes 151, 152, 192 and 194 were transferred to the Tancos airfield, they were given at that location the serials respectively 185,186 183 and 184. On the same date the Moranes 183 and 184, which had been based at Tancos were transferred to Sintra where they maintained these same serial numbers. This lead that during 1936 and 1937 four aircraft used simultaneously two serials.

Also there were cases where two different types of aircraft were assigned the same block of serial numbers. This was the case of the Tiger Moth and Junkers Ju 52, both using the 100 to 110 block, and the range 125 to 137 being used simultaneously by the Avro 626 and Tiger Moth.

However, even with this mistakes this system wasn't immediately applied everywhere, as in October 1935, there were still aircraft flying with the previous sequence system.

==== 2nd block numbering system version ====
After the military aeronautic restructuring of 1937, a new block numbering system was implemented with the Administrative Regulation 642 of June 3, 1938. This new system implemented the same block numbering system as the previous one, but more clearly defined, in which blocks of 50 serial numbers were assigned to each of the eight aircraft types in service. The blocks ranged from 101 to 450, being a last block of 501 to 549 assigned to special aircraft, either because they were bought for test or were single example of a certain type.

Also it was stated that the changes should be implemented as soon as possible, and that aircraft should maintain their serial numbers even when transferred to other bases.

Serial number blocks
Aircraft type	Serial
de Havilland Tiger Moth DH-82	101–150
Avro and Morane-Saulnier	151–199
Junkers Ju 52	201–250
Junkers Ju 86	251–299
Potez	301–340
Vickers	351–380
Hawker Fury and Hind	401–420
Gloster Gladiator	451–499
Various (de Havilland DH-84 Dragon, Caproni, etc.)	501–549

During World War II a large number of aircraft was interned and incorporated in the Aeronáutica Militar, forcing the use of serial numbers that had been assigned to aircraft meanwhile retired. This resulted in assignment of blocks starting to 510 and 600 to the Hawker Hurricanes. The 300 block series used before by the Potez 25 (retired) was reassigned to the new Supermarine Spitfire I, P-38 Lightning and P-39 Airacobra. However, the Supermarine Spitfire V received still during the war and afterwards, was given as an oddity the serial number block 1 to 95.

The 700 block series was assigned to the AT-6 and Harvards that were received from 1947. The Airspeed Oxford was assigned the 500 block series which was also used by the de Havilland DH-84 Dragon (504 to 506).

==== Alpha-numeric system ====
A special alpha-number serial system was assigned during World War II to some aircraft that were forced to land in Portugal and were ultimately interned and later incorporated in the Aeronáutica Militar. This system was used to six Consolidated Liberators, which were given the serials L-1 to L-6; the Lockheed Hudson, H-1 to H-3; and the Douglas C-47 Dakota (D-1).

==== Independent numbering system ====
An independent numbering system was used in Mozambique by the aircraft assigned to the Quartel General de Lourenço Marques (Army Headquarters at Lourenço Marques), in the 1940s. Serial numbers with one or two digits were given to these aircraft. For example, Tiger Moth 1 to 9, Hornet Moth 10, General Aircraft Monospar 15, Avro Anson 20 and 21, and Beechcraft Bonanza 25. In 1946 these aircraft were transferred and assigned to the Unidade de Instrução Aeronáutica (Aeronautical Training Unit).

With the implementation of Regulation 13602 of July 11, 1951, these aircraft also received numbers in the new system, and in May 1952 some of them were transferred to the Portuguese Air Force.

==== Four digits system ====
With the Regulation 13602, of July 11, 1951, a new four-digit system was introduced. This was a totally different system compared to the previous one and took time to be completely adopted.

The Administrative Note 969 of June 8, 1951, of the 2nd Repartition stated that this new system was to be applied only to the following aircraft in the inventory: de Havilland Canada DHC-1 Chipmunk, AT-6, Harvard, Junkers Ju 52, Douglas C-47, SB-17, Douglas C-54 Skymaster. Although, later other aircraft already in service in 1951 received serials from the new system. It was the case of the Miles Magister (12**), Airspeed Oxford (21**), Avro Anson (22**), and de Havilland DH-84 Dragon (23**).

=== Naval Aviation ===
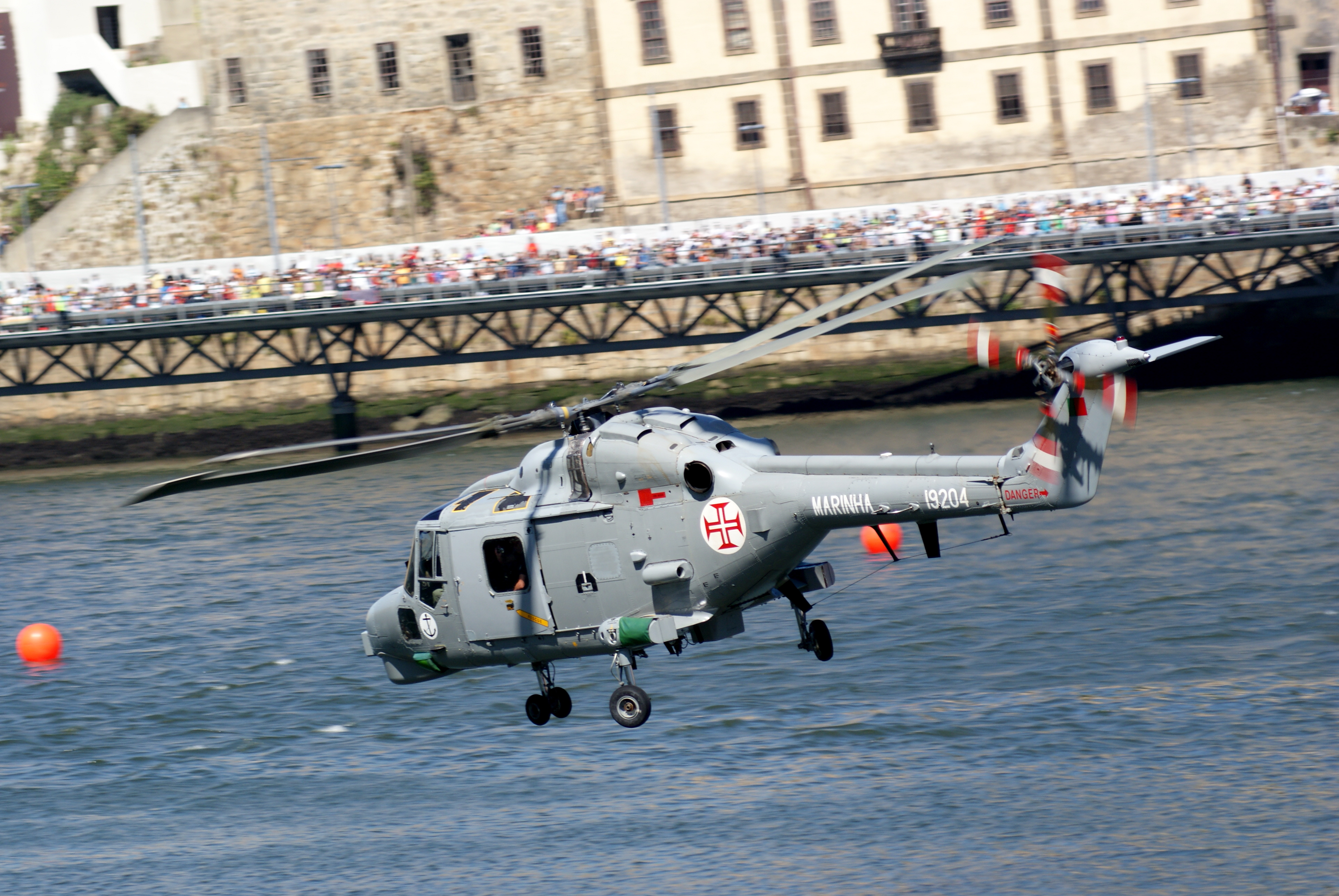
A Portuguese Navy Lynx Mk-95 helicopter, 19204, in accordance with the integrated system for the serial number.

The first system used by the Portuguese Naval Aviation was a general sequential system. This system began being implemented in 1917 with the F.B.A hydroplanes, which consisted in the assignment of the natural numbering sequence (1,2,3, ...) to each aircraft type.

==== Unique sequential system ====
This new unique sequential system consisted in the assignment of serial numbers beginning at 1, but only in one series and to all aircraft in service, in way to prevent two different aircraft types of having the same serial number.

In some cases, a second number was assigned to each aircraft to represent its position within the naval fleet, thus allowing an easier identification.

==== Alpha-numeric system ====
From 1943, during World War II, the Naval Aviation received aircraft from the United Kingdom, and after the last example of the sequential system (136) a new system was implemented.

A serial consisting of two parts, being the first part a letter designating either the manufacturer or the primary mission of the aircraft, and the second part a number separated from the letter by a hyphen, and designating the aircraft order within the fleet.

Serial number blocks
Aircraft type	Serial
Beechcraft AT-11 Kansan, Beechcraft D-18S	BC-1 to BC-12
North American SNJ-4	I-1 to I-8
Curtiss SB2C-5 Helldiver	AS-1 to AS-24
Bristol Beaufighter	BF-1 to BF-17

This system was used until 1952, when the Naval Aviation aircraft was integrated into the Portuguese Air Force, and the Air Force serial system was adopted.

==== Integrated system ====
In 1993, with the creation of the newly Esquadrilha de Helicópteros da Marinha (Navy's Helicopter Squadron), the AgustaWestland Super Lynx Mk.95 helicopters were assigned the serial numbers 9201 to 9205, in accordance to the regulations in use with the Air Force. However, when the Air Force integrated system was introduced in 1993 they also received the digit 1 before the assigned serials (becoming 19201 to 19205), and had the color of the serial number changed from black to white.

=== Air Force ===
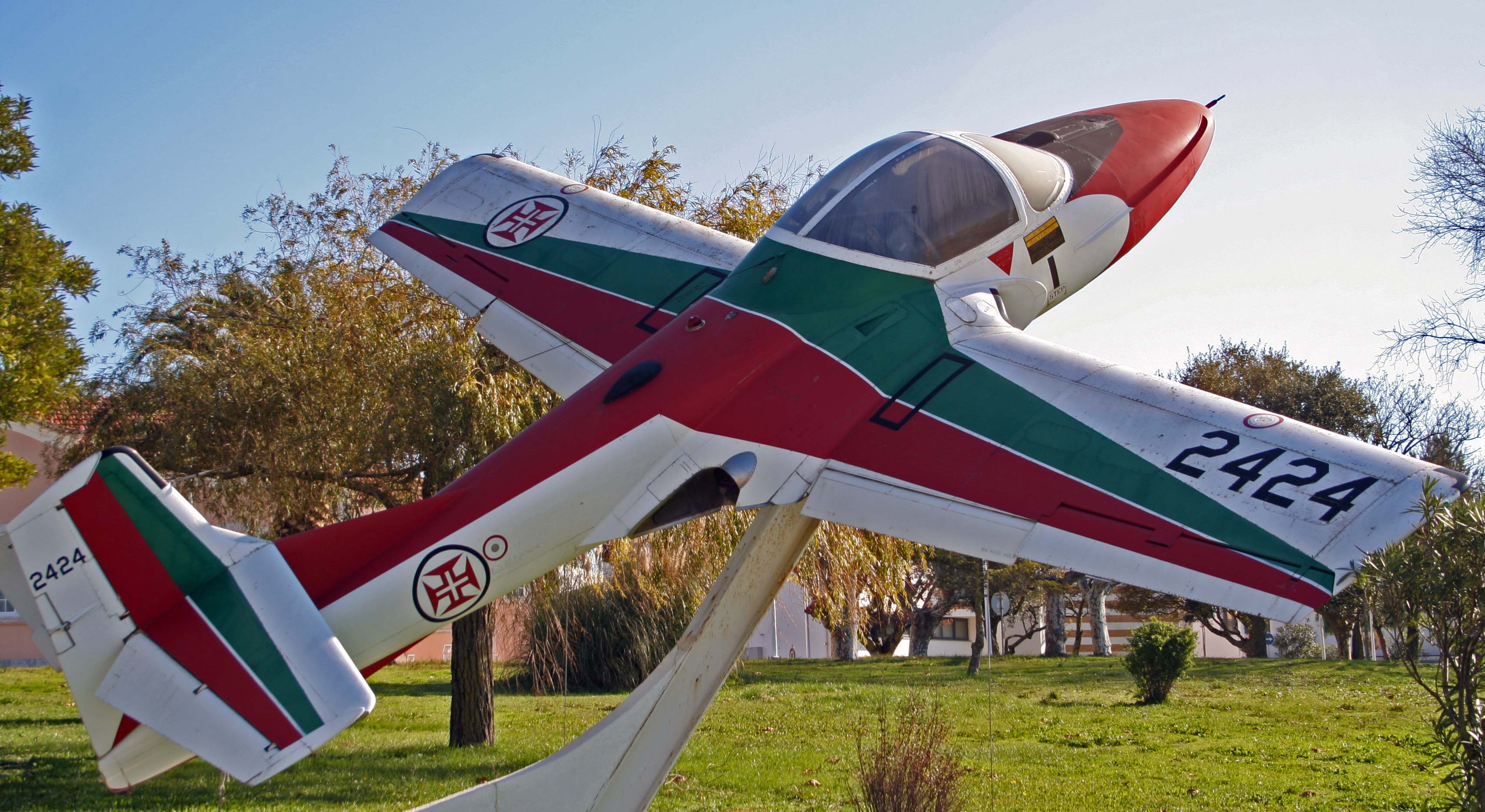
Cessna T-37 Tweet, serial number 2424, of the PoAF with the painting scheme of the Asas de Portugal.

The four digit system developed by the Army Military Aviation was inherited by the Air Force. Seven basic functions for the aircraft in service were defined, which corresponded to the first digit in a four digit serial number. The second digit corresponded to a specific aircraft model, and the two remaining were assigned in sequence.

First digit and function correspondence
First digit	Function
1	Single engine training
2	Multi-engine training
3	Reconnaissance and/or observation
4	Fighter or anti-submarine aircraft (Piston engine)
5	Fighter (Jet engine)
6	Transport
7	Search and rescue or bomber (Piston engine)
8	Reserved
9	Miscellaneous

The complete revision of the serial numbers applied to the whole inventory was only completed by 1958. Even then, some aircraft coming from the Naval Aviation, never received correct serial numbers within this system.

On August 5, 1969, the Direcção de Serviço de Material (Directorate of Material Service) new rules introduced some slight changes in the system. Basically the meaning of the first digit, the type, represented from then on a mix between the function/mission and type/class of aircraft. This was intended to solve the shortage of available serial numbers and the introduction of new types of aircraft.

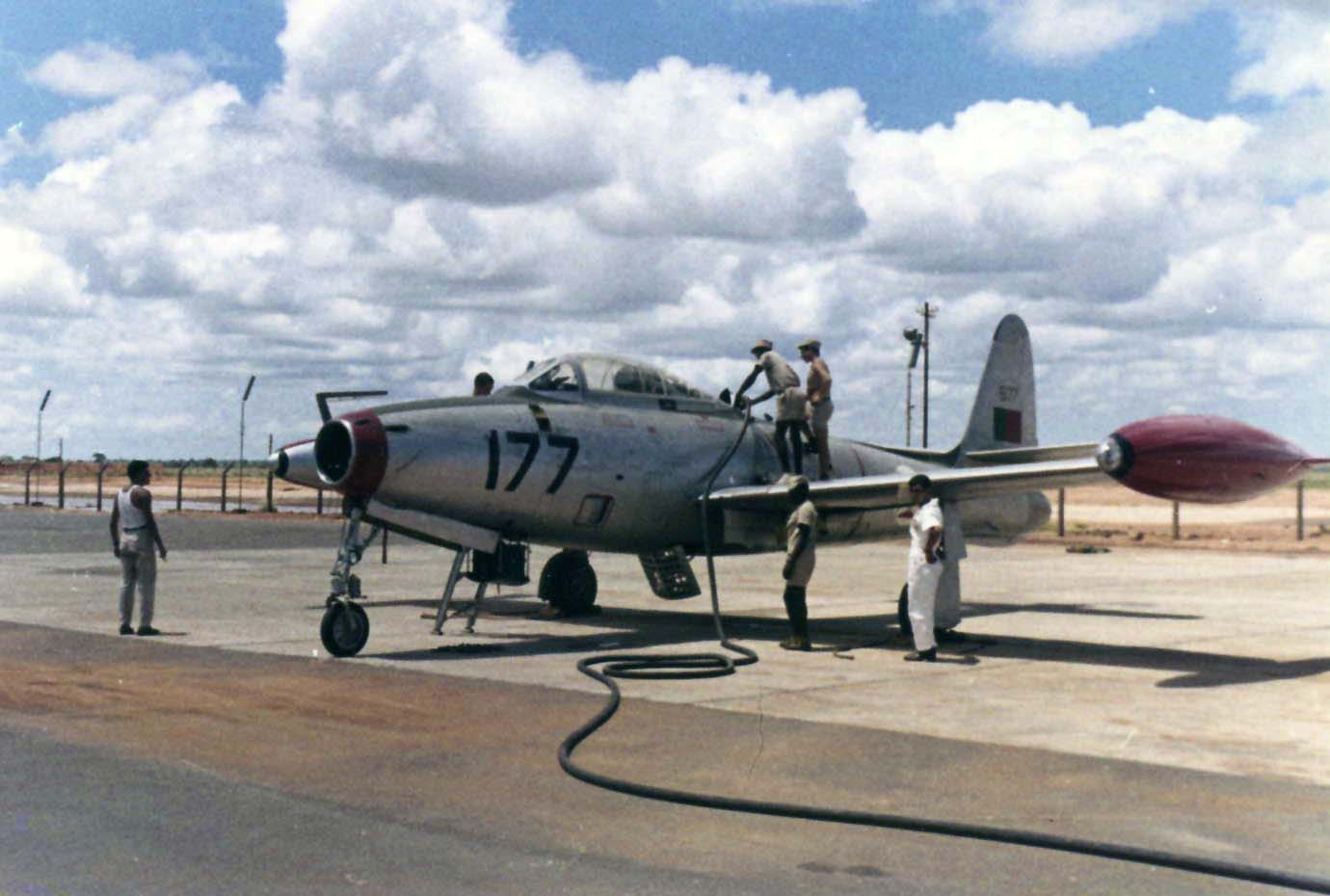
A PoAF' F-84G Thunderjet, with the serial number 5177, refueling in Angola. The whole number is painted on the tail, with the last three digits painted on the front fuselage in large numbers.

First digit and type correspondence
First digit	Type
1	Single engine training
2	Multi-engine training
3	Reconnaissance and/or observation
4	Fighter or anti-submarine aircraft (Piston engine)
5	Fighter (Jet engine)
6	Transport (Piston engine)
7	Search and rescue or bomber (Piston engine)
8	Multi-engined jet (except fighters)
9	Miscellaneous

The B-26 Invaders were the first type to receive serials (7101 to 7107).

On December 22, 1988, a study by the Air Force Headquarters 3rd Division was created with the intent of updating the serial system concept, thus correcting some deviations that had happened since the implementation of the 1951/1969 system. The most important of these deviations had been:

- Vought A-7P Corsair II: Received serial numbers in the range 5501 to 5550, not being fighters.
- Lockheed P-3P Orion: Received serial numbers in the range 4801 to 4806, which corresponded to fighters with piston engines.
- Alexander Schleicher ASK 21: Received the serial numbers 1001 to 1004, being a sailplane/glider.

This new system would be a compromise between the existing system and the needs arising from the automatic treatment of information. However, the defined criteria would force the change of all serial numbers in the Air Force aircraft inventory, and the changes were not approved.

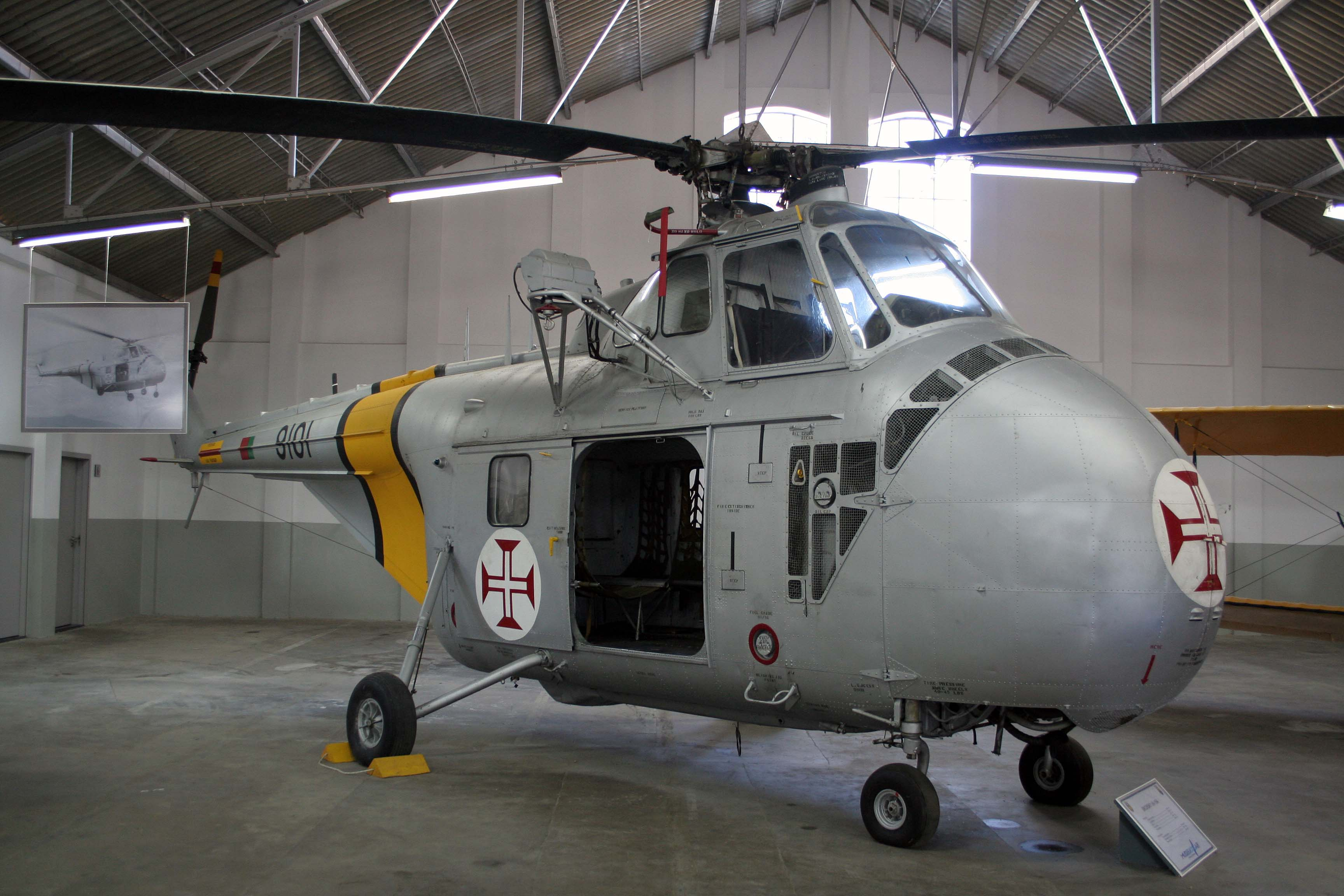
A PoAF's UH-19 helicopter, with serial number 8101, at the Air Museum.

First digit and type correspondence
First digit	Type/class
1	Sailplanes (gliders) with or without engine
2	Conventional aircraft, single engine
3	Conventional aircraft, multi-engine
4	Turboprop aircraft, single engine
5	Turboprop aircraft, multi-engine
6	Jet aircraft, single engine
7	Jet aircraft, multi-engine
8	Helicopters, single engine
9	Helicopters, multi-engine

Nevertheless, some serial numbers using this system were applied to aircraft bought in the meantime. It was the case of the Dassault Falcon 50 (74**), Westland Lynx (92**), and the Lockheed F-16 Fighting Falcon (66**).

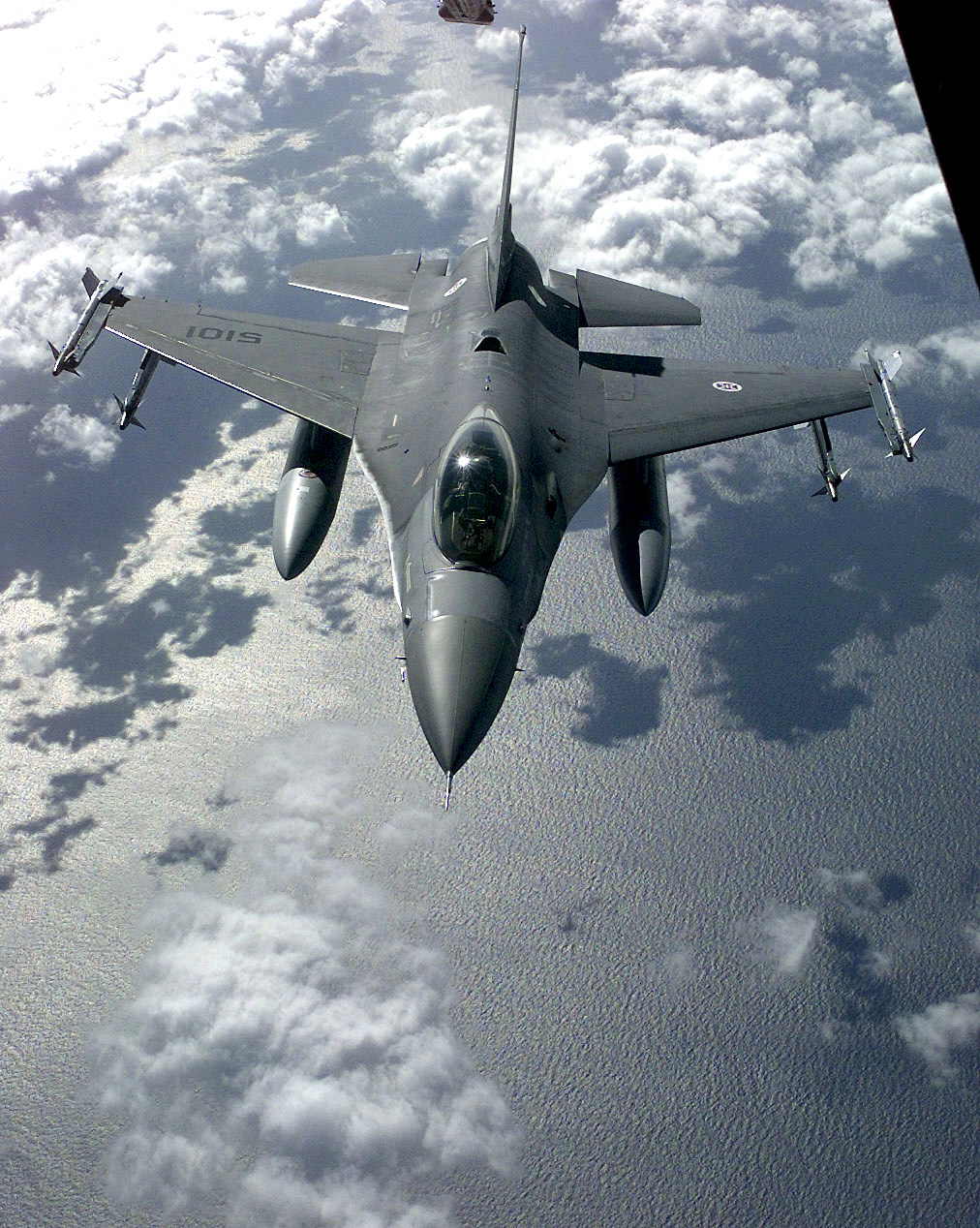
An F-16 Fighting Falcon, with the serial number 15101, of the Portuguese Air Force prepares to refuel from a KC-10. March 19, 1999

On January 1, 1994, the Sistema de Atribuição de Números de Matrícula (Serial Number Assignment System) was established, adding a fifth digit to the serial.

- 1st digit — Series: It was decided that aircraft not in service at the implementation date would remain in the series 0, thus maintaining in consequence the four digit serial number as before. Thus using the first digit 0 only for data systems handling, and never being displayed in the aircraft. Aircraft in service would receive the digit 1.
- 2nd digit — Type: The second digit is associated to the basic function of the aircraft.
- 3rd digit — Manufacturer/model: Aircraft fleets of the same model.
- 4th and 5th digits — Sequential number of the same aircraft model.

Second digit and function association
Second digit	Function/mission
0	Aircraft without engine
1	Training single engine and sailplanes/gliders with engine
2	Training multi-engine
3	Liaison and/or reconnaissance
4	Maritime patrol and bombers
5	Fighters and fighter-bombers
6	Transport
7	Support and specials
8	Reserved
9	Helicopters and miscellaneous

The implementation of this system forced the following changes:

- Alexander Schleicher ASK 21 from 1001–1004 to 10101–10104
- Dassault Falcon 20 from 8101–8103 to 17101–17103
- Lockheed F-16A Fighting Falcon from 6601–6617 to 15101–15117 (this change occurred before delivery)
- Lockheed F-16B Fighting Falcon from 6618–6620 to 15118–15120

== See also ==
- Army Light Aviation Unit (Portugal)
- Japanese military aircraft designation systems
- List of aircraft of the Portuguese Armed Forces
- Portuguese Air Force
- Portuguese Naval Aviation
- United Kingdom military aircraft serial numbers
- United States military aircraft serial numbers
