= Ligne Aérienne du Roi Albert =

Airline of Belgian Congo

LARA
- Founded: 1920
- Ceased operations: 1922
- Hubs: Leopoldville
- Fleet size: 6
- Destinations: Leopoldville, Ngombe, Lisala, Stanleyville
- Headquarters: Leopoldville, Belgian Congo
- Key people: Emile Allard

Ligne Aérienne du Roi Albert (LARA; "King Albert Airline") was a short-lived civilian airline in the Belgian Congo colony.

== History ==
Belgium had set up the SNETA in 1919 to study the possibilities and options of civilian air transport. In Europe, Sabena was created as a result, in their African colony the Belgians created CENAC (Comité d' Etude pour la Navigation Aérienne du Congo), which would evolve into the Ligne Aerienne du Roi Albert, so named after Albert I of Belgium who was a driving force behind the project in 1920.

The possibility of exploiting an aerial route along the Congo River was studied under the leadership of Emile Allard, civil engineer, and Mr Michaux, a military officer.

== Routes and Destinations ==
The airline had only a short life, first opening a 580 kilometres (360 mi) leg from Leopoldville, since renamed Kinshasa, to Ngombe on July 1, 1920. The second leg, 610 kilometres (380 mi) from Ngombe to Lisala, was opened on March 3, 1921. On July 1, 1921, exactly one year after the initial flight, the entire route from Kinshasa to Stanleyville (1,725 kilometres (1,072 mi)) was finally opened, but operations were discontinued on June 7, 1922.

== Fleet ==
- Levy Lepen hydroplane

LARA operated six French-built Levy Lepen HB2 hydroplanes upstream along the Congo River. This choice was dictated by the absence of any landing sites along the route. The aircraft were also used to photograph and map the area. The airline was the very first one set-up by a European colonial power overseas. In total 125,000 kilometres (78,000 mi) were covered during the airline's short life, amounting to 80 round trips, carrying 95 passengers and 2 tons of mail.

== Demise ==
After its demise in 1922, a Congo local network was set up in 1925 by Sabena, operating Handley-Page W8 trimotors, followed by a regular Belgium-Congo link in 1935 using Fokker VIIs.
