= ANTEX-M =

General information
- Type: Unmanned aerial vehicle
- National origin: Portugal
- Manufacturer: Portuguese Air Force Academy
- Primary user: Portuguese Air Force

History
- Manufactured: 2002—current

ANTEX-M (Portuguese: Aeronave Não Tripulada Experimental – Militar, Military Experimental Unmanned Aircraft) is a family of small- and medium-sized experimental unmanned aerial vehicles developed by the Portuguese Air Force in partnership with several universities and institutes. The development program is part of the PITVANT program and is funded by the Portuguese National Defense Ministry until 2015.

The objective of the ANTEX-M is not to develop a fully operational UAV system to execute PoAF missions but to demonstrate aeronautical technology and support research and development projects of the Portuguese Air Force Academy and other academic and industrial partners.

== History ==
The first program for the development of the ANTEX M was created by the Portuguese Air Force in 2002. This program had the objective of jointly researching and developing an experimental military UAV with the Portuguese Air Force Academy's Investigation Center (Portuguese: Centro de Investigação Academia da Força Aérea) and several national and international institutes, universities, and industry partners (EDISOFT). The program's cost was estimated to be €2 million and was canceled before starting due to lack of funding.

Another program, under the same name, was established in partnership with the Technical Institute (IST) of the University of Lisbon for the development of a remotely controlled vehicle for flight testing new aeronautical composites and materials. During this program the ANTEX-M models X00, X01 and X02 were developed and participated in the European projects Active Aeroelastic Aircraft Structures (3AS) and Aircraft Reliability Through Intelligent Materials Application (ARTIMA).

From 2006 to 2008, the Air Force Academy and the Faculty of Engineering of the University of Porto (FEUP) collaborated in developing an autonomous flight control system for unmanned aircraft.

In 2007, the Portuguese Air Force created the PITVANT (Portuguese: Projecto de Investigação e Tecnologia em Veículos Aéreos Não Tripulados, Unmanned Aerial Vehicle Investigation and Technology Project), and presented it as a proposal to the National Defense Ministry for the allocation of €2 million in funding to be distributed during the seven years in which the project would be active.

The project focus on the design, construction and testing of small and medium UAV platforms, interoperability of unmanned systems, data fusion, navigation systems. Included is also the testing of the systems in military scenarios, such as: maritime patrol, search and rescue, coastal surveillance, sea pollution control, and reconnaissance.

The development of the ANTEX-M as part of PITVANT involves the FEUP (AsasF Project), IST, Institute of Geodesy and Navigation at the University of the Bundeswehr Munich, and the University of Victoria.

== Specifications (ANTEX-M X03) ==
Data from Cadernos do IDN Series II No. 4, p. 22

General characteristics

- Crew: none
- Capacity: 30 kg (66.13 lb) useful load
- Wingspan: 7.0 m (22 ft 11 in)
- Max takeoff weight: 150 kg (330.6 lb)

Performance

- Maximum speed: 130 km/h (81 mph, 70.19 kn)
- Stall speed: 40 km/h (25 mph, 21.59 kn)
- Endurance: 15 hours
- Service ceiling: 4,500 m (14,763.8 ft)

== Operators ==
Portugal

- Portuguese Air Force: At least 4 units received, all built by Portuguese Air Force Academy.

== See also ==
- Unmanned aerial vehicle
- Portuguese Air Force
- Faculdade de Engenharia da Universidade do Porto

Aircraft of comparable role, configuration, and era

- AAI RQ-2 Pioneer
- AAI RQ-7 Shadow

Related lists

- List of unmanned aerial vehicles
