= UAVision =

Portuguese UAV manufacturer

UAVision Aeronautics
- Company type: Private
- Industry: Development of Unmanned aerial vehicles
- Founded: 2005
- Headquarters: Portugal
- Number of employees: 30
- Website: https://www.uavision.com

UAVision Aeronautics is a Portuguese defense contractor headquartered in Ventosa, Alenquer, that designs and manufactures unmanned aerial vehicles (UAVs) and subsystems. It initially focused on the development and manufacture of autopilots and communication systems. UAvision has provided UAS platforms in four continents operating in the most diverse environments. In addition to an important collaboration with the European Union and the Portuguese Armed Forces, the company is present in international markets, namely Brazil, Nigeria, Angola, South Korea, India, United Arab Emirates and Germany. UAvision has also participated in Exercise REP(MUS) since 2019.

== Products ==
UAVison provides the following products:

- UAV ELANUS (Loitering munition)
- UAV OGASSA OGS42 Extended (Unmanned aerial vehicle);
- UAV OGASSA OGS42 VTOL (Unmanned aerial vehicle);
- UAV SPYRO (Unmanned aerial vehicle);
- UGV MPAV-01 (Unmanned ground vehicle);
- UGS 400 Gimbal (Forward-looking infrared);
- StormCOMM (Military Antenna)
- Fire Detection System;
- Ground Control Stations.

== Users ==
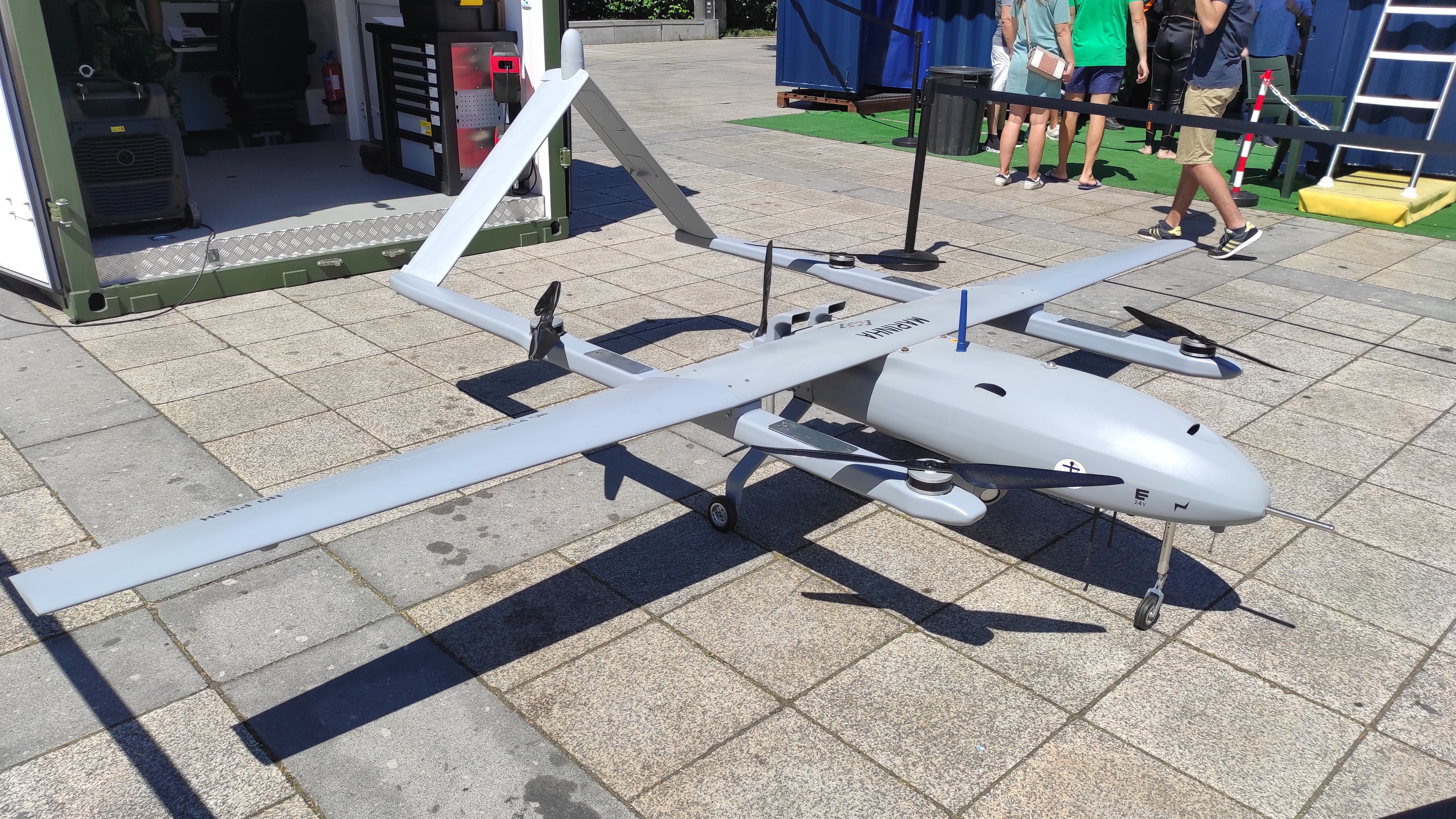
UAVision OGASSA OGS42 VTOL of the Portuguese Navy.

Portugal

- Portuguese Navy: (UAV OGASSA OGS42 VTOL and UAV SPYRO);
- Portuguese Air Force: (UAV OGASSA OGS42 and UAV OGASSA OGS42 VTOL);
- Polícia Judiciária: (UAV OGASSA OGS42 VTOL and UAV SPYRO);
- National Republican Guard: (UAV SPYRO).

Nigeria

- Nigerian Air Force.

Ukraine

- Armed Forces of Ukraine: (UAV OGASSA OGS42).
