= Tekever =

Portuguese communications company

- Type: Private
- Industry: Information technologies, aerospace, defence and security
- Founded: 2001
- Headquarters: Lisbon region, Portugal
- Area served: Worldwide
- Products: Unmanned aerial systems, satellites
- Services: Digital transformation, aerial surveillance
- Number of employees: 1,200
- Website: www.tekever.com

Tekever is an IT, aerospace, defence and security technologies company based in the Lisbon region and UK. It was founded in 2001 by former students of the IST engineering school. In 2006, it initiated a process of internationalization, and now also has operating branches in United Kingdom, USA, and France, among others. It is the leading company in several European technological joint ventures.

== Products ==
Tekever manufactures the following products:

- Tekever AR3 – autonomous small unmanned aerial system (UAS), for medium range maritime and land-based ISTAR missions. The AR3 can be catapult launched and parachute or net retrieved, or use its optionally VTOL capability for additional flexibility and a more reduced logistics footprint;
- Tekever AR4 – hand launched mini-UAS, for close range maritime and land-based ISTAR missions;
- Tekever AR5 – SATCOM-enabled tactical UAS for medium and long range maritime and land ISTAR missions.
- Tekever ARX - Unmanned surveillance and reconnaissance aerial vehicle.
- Tekever Heavy-lift - autonomous UAV developed for cargo transport missions.
- Inter-Satellite Link (ISL)

== Operators ==
=== Current operators ===
Germany

- German Army: Tekever Heavy-lift.

Brazil:

- Brazilian Navy: Tekever AR2 Carcará

Canada:

- Phoenix Heli-Flight - Tekever AR3.

Colombia:

- Military Forces of Colombia.

France:

- French Navy: Tekever AR3 EVO.

European Union

- European Maritime Safety Agency: Tekever AR5.
- European Space Agency: Inter-Satellite Link (ISL)

Indonesia:

- Indonesian National Board for Disaster Management: Tekever AR4.

Nigeria:

- Nigerian Maritime Administration and Safety Agency: Tekever AR3.
- Nigerian Navy: Tekever AR3.
- Nigerian Air Force: Tekever AR3.

Portugal:

- National Republican Guard: Tekever AR3, Tekever AR4 Light Ray and Tekever AR5;
- Polícia de Segurança Pública: Tekever AR1 Blue Ray;
- Polícia Marítima: Tekever AR3;
- Portuguese Navy: Tekever AR3 and Tekever AR4;
- Portuguese Army: Tekever AR4 during deployment in Kosovo.
- Portuguese Air Force: Tekever ARX and Tekever AR5.

Senegal:

- Senegalese Fishing Ministry: Tekever AR3.

Spain:

- National Police Corps: Tekever AR3.

Ukraine:

- Armed Forces of Ukraine: Tekever AR3 and Tekever AR5.

United Kingdom:

- Home Office (United Kingdom): Tekever AR5. Tekever was awarded a 3 year contract by the Home Office in 2019 worth up to £1bn.
- Royal Air Force: Tekever AR3 (designated StormShroud when fitted with the Leonardo BriteStorm system).
- British Army: Tekever AR5 selected under Project Corvus to replace the Army's Watchkeeper WK450 in the ISTAR role. Up to £400 million has been made available for AR5 procurement. An initial batch of 6 is planned, with up to 24 planned to be procured by 2029.

United States:

- United States Special Operations Command.

=== Potential operators ===
Angola:

- Angolan Armed Forces.

United States:

- United States Army.
