= Georges Levy G.L.40 =

French aircraft (designed 1917)

G.L. 40
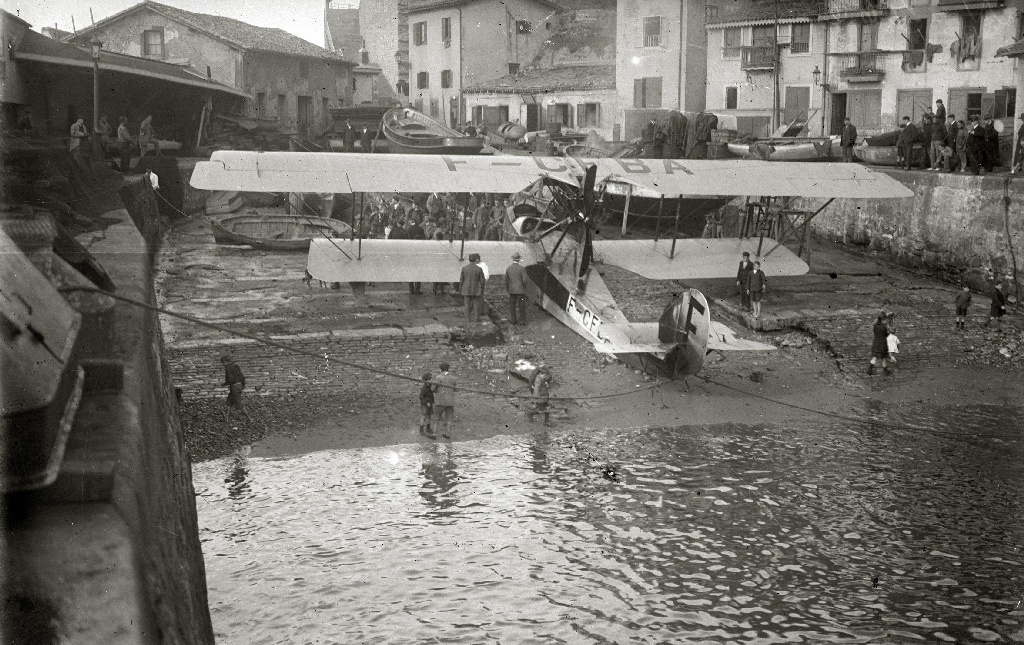

General information
- Type: amphibious aircraft
- Manufacturer: Hydravions Georges Lévy
- Designer: Blanchard and Le Pen
- Primary users: French Air Force Finnish Air Force

History
- Introduction date: November 1917
- First flight: 1917

Georges Levy G.L. 40 HB2 was a three-seated French, amphibious biplane aircraft that was designed in 1917. The aircraft was designed by Blanchard and Le Pen and therefore the aircraft was also known as the Levy-Le Pen. Le Pen was Maurice Jules-Marie Le Pen born in Lorient, Morbihan, France in 1889; he was killed in a car crash in 1919. It was claimed to be the best French amphibious aircraft of World War I, but that is probably due to the low scale production of such aircraft in France at that time.

The Finnish Air Force purchased 12 Georges Levy G.L. 40 HB2s, but they weren't pleased with them. Three aircraft were lost in accidents that claimed lives — and it was given the nickname "the flying coffin" in the 1920s.

In 1920, the Belgian government started an airline in the then Belgian Congo: Ligne Aérienne du Roi Albert (LARA) operated six Levy-Lepen hydroplanes along the Congo River from Leopoldville (now Kinshasa) upstream to Stanleyville (now Kisangani), a distance of 1725 kilometres. The flights started in June 1921 and were discontinued one or two years later.

== Operators ==
Finland
Finnish Air Force - 12 aircraft, withdrawn from use by 1923.
France
French Navy - in service from November 1917, app. 100 built, also by Farman. Used in France, Algeria, Greece, Morocco, Senegal and Tunisia.
Portugal

- Portuguese Naval Aviation - 2 aircraft used from 1918 to 1920

Peru

- Peruvian Air Force - app. 3 delivered
- Peruvian Navy

Belgium
6 Levy Lepen were used in the Belgian Congo by the Ligne Aerienne du Roi Albert.
United States

- United States Navy - 12 used for patrols from Le Croisic in France, two taken to US after the war.

== Specifications (G.L. 40 HB2) ==
Data from Thulinista Hornetiin – 75 vuotta Suomen ilmavoimien lentokoneita

General characteristics

- Crew: 3
- Length: 12.4 m (40 ft 8 in)
- Wingspan: 18.5 m (60 ft 8 in)
- Height: 3.85 m (12 ft 8 in)
- Wing area: 68.75 m^{2} (740.0 sq ft)
- Empty weight: 1,450 kg (3,197 lb)
- Max takeoff weight: 2,350 kg (5,181 lb)
- Powerplant: 1 × Renault 12Fe V-12 water-cooled piston engine, 224 kW (300 hp)
- Propellers: 4-bladed fixed-pitch pusher propeller

Performance

- Maximum speed: 145 km/h (90 mph, 78 kn)
- Cruise speed: 115 km/h (71 mph, 62 kn)
- Range: 400 km (250 mi, 220 nmi)
- Service ceiling: 3,505 m (11,499 ft)

Armament

- Guns: 1 × machine gun
- Bombs: 200 kg (440 lb) of bombs

== See also ==
Related lists

- List of military aircraft of France
- List of aircraft of the Finnish Air Force
