= Portuguese Air Force =

Aerial warfare branch of Portugal's armed forces

- Força Aérea Portuguesa
- Coat of arms of the Portuguese Air Force
- Founded: 1 July 1952; 74 years ago
- Country: Portugal
- Type: Air force
- Size: 6,224 personnel (2025); 110 aircraft; 12 UAVs; 7 gliders
- Part of: Portuguese Armed Forces
- Headquarters: Alfragide
- Patron: Our Lady of Loreto
- Mottos: Latin: Ex Mero Motu; (English: "Of his own free will")
- Anniversaries: 1 July
- Engagements: Portuguese Overseas War; NATO bombing of Yugoslavia
- Website: www.emfa.pt

Commanders
- Chief of Staff of the Air Force: General Sérgio da Costa Pereira
- Notable commanders: Craveiro Lopes; Humberto Delgado; Kaulza de Arriaga

Insignia
- Roundel

- Fin flash

Aircraft flown
- Fighter: F-16 MLU
- Multirole helicopter: EH-101 Merlin, UH-60 Black Hawk
- Utility helicopter: AW119 Koala
- Patrol: P-3C CUP+ Orion
- Reconnaissance: C-295MPA Persuader, UAVision OGS-42N/VN
- Trainer: TB 30 Epsilon, DHC-1 Chipmunk, ASK 21, LET L-23 Super Blaník
- Transport: KC-390, C-130 Hercules, C-295M, Falcon 900, Falcon 50
- Tanker: KC-390

The Portuguese Air Force (Portuguese: Força Aérea Portuguesa) is the air force branch of the Portuguese Armed Forces (Forças Armadas). Locally it is referred to by the acronym FAP but internationally is often referred to by the acronym PRTAF. It is the youngest of the three branches of the Portuguese Armed Forces.

The Portuguese Air Force was formed on 1 July 1952, when the former Aeronáutica Militar (Army Aviation) and Aviação Naval (Naval Aviation) were united and formed an independent air branch of the Armed Forces.

However, the remote origins of the FAP go back to the early 20th century with the establishment of the first military air unit in 1911, the Military Aeronautics School in 1914, the participation of Portuguese pilots in World War I, the establishment of the Army, and the Navy aviation services.

The FAP is commanded by the Chief of Staff of the Air Force (CEMFA), a subordinate of the Chief of the General Staff of the Armed Forces for operational matters and a direct subordinate of the Minister of National Defense for all other matters. The CEMFA is the only officer in the Air Force with the rank of general (four-star rank).

Presently, the FAP is an entirely professional force made of career personnel (officers and NCOs) and of volunteer personnel (officers, NCOs, and enlisted ranks). As of 2018, the FAP employed a total of 5,949 military personnel, of which 1,939 were officers, 2,620 were NCOs, and 1,390 were other enlisted ranks. Additionally, the Air Force further included 727 civilian employees (totally 6,676 personnel).

Besides its warfare role, the FAP has also public service roles, namely assuring the Portuguese Air Search and Rescue Service. Until 2014, the FAP also integrated the National Aeronautical Authority (AAN). The AAN is now a separate body, but continues to be headed by the Chief of Staff of the Air Force, with the Air Force assuring most of its activities, namely the air policing service.

Its aerobatic display teams are the Asas de Portugal for jet aircraft and the Rotores de Portugal for helicopters, but both have been inactive since 2010.

== History ==
=== Beginnings ===
The remote origins of the Portuguese Air Force lie in the origins of the Portuguese military aeronautics.

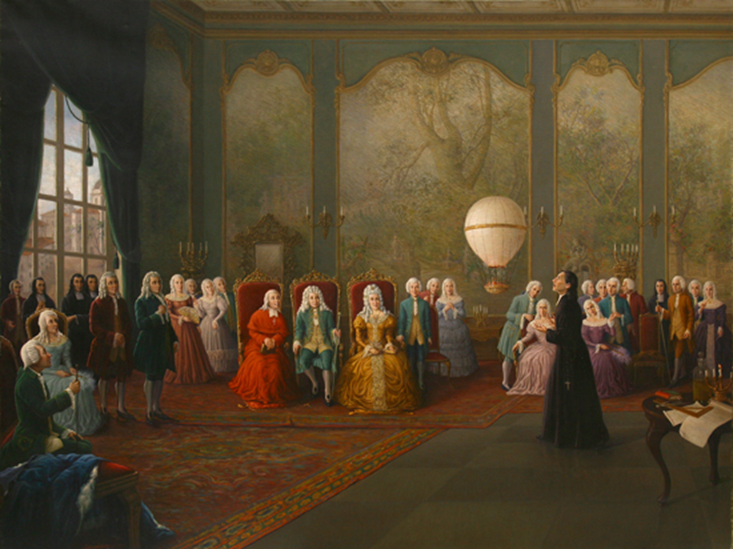
Bartolomeu de Gusmão presenting his invention to the court of John V of Portugal

Portugal was directly linked with the history of aeronautics since its early beginnings. In 1709, the Portuguese priest Bartolomeu de Gusmão requested a patent for a device to move through the air, which consisted of a kind of hot air balloon. The patent was granted on 19 April 1709 and small scale models of this device were tested with success on several occasions, including before the court of King John V of Portugal. Accordingly, with some opinions, a real scale device would have performed a crewed flight over the city of Lisbon, taking off from the São Jorge Castle and landing at the Cotovia Hill. This may have been the first manned flight in history.

In 1876, General Augusto Bon de Sousa proposed the use of aerostats as means of observation and communication. This proposal was implemented in 1886, with the beginning of the use of Lachambre balloons by the Army Engineering School at Tancos. The organization of the Army Telegraphic Service of 1900 assigned it the charge for the aerostation service, namely the specific competency for establishing air communications.

The history of the Portuguese military aviation proper is deeply connected with the foundation of the Air Club of Portugal (AeCP) on 11 December 1909, by 30 aviation enthusiasts, the majority of them being Army officers. The AeCP became one of the major boosters of the development of aviation in Portugal in the early 20th century, including its military use. The AeCP sponsored Abeillard Gomes da Silva in the design and building of the first Portuguese airplane, financed by the War Ministry and tested at the Army School of Engineering, Tancos on 13 January 1910.

Despite the previous use of balloons by the Portuguese Army, its first flying unit was only created in 1911, in the scope of the military reorganisation that occurred that year. This unit was the Aerostation Company (Companhia de Aerosteiros), which was part of the Army Telegraphic Service and was intended to operate observation aerostats. This unit would later receive a handful of airplanes.

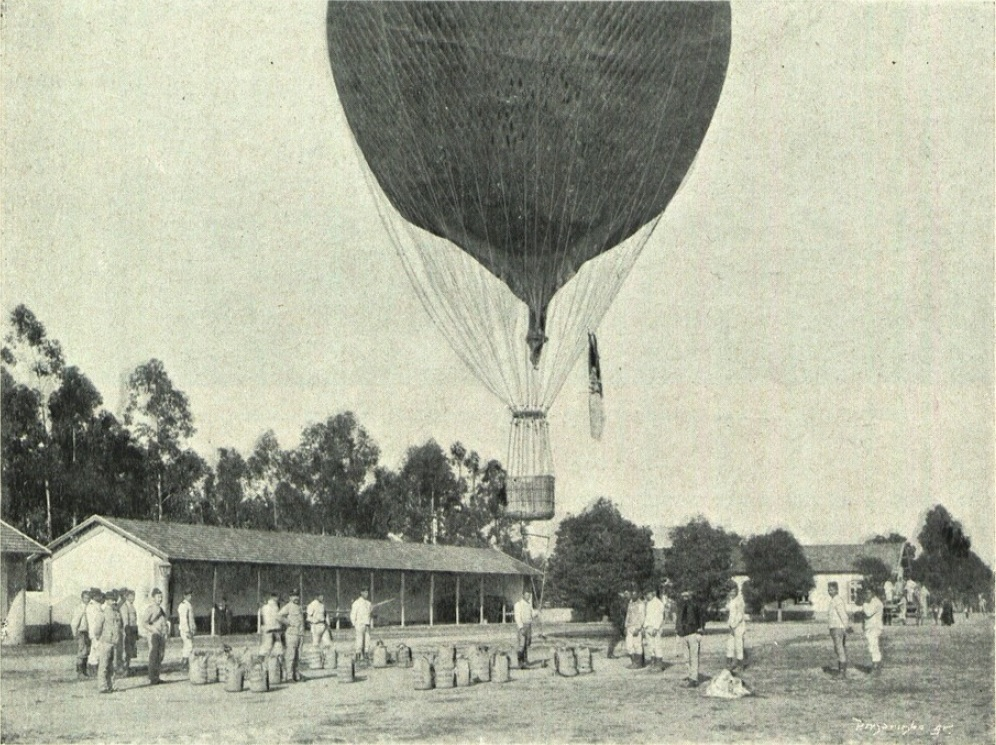
Captive balloon being employed at the Army Engineering School in the beginning of the 20th century

In 1912, the Portuguese Government received its first airplane, a Deperdussin B, offered by the Portuguese-born Colonel Albino Costa of the Brazilian Army. The Government further received a Maurice Farman MF4 offered by the O Comércio do Porto newspaper and an Avro 500 offered by the Portuguese Republican Party. These aircraft would be integrated in the Aerostation Company, but remained for years without use because of the non-existence of pilots.

Still in 1912, midshipman Miguel Freitas Home of the naval purser branch applied for admission to any course that would qualify him as an aviator. He was the first member of the Portuguese Military to formally request to be an aircraft pilot.

In the same year, by request of the AeCP, the legislator António José de Almeida presented a bill to the Portuguese Parliament for the creation of a Military Aviation Institute. Despite the non-approval of the bill, the War Ministry appointed an ad hoc commission, made up of officers of the Army and Navy (including some members of the AeCP), intended to study the basis for the creation of aviation, balloon and airship schools. By the Army Order of 12 February 1913, this became the permanent Military Aeronautics Commission, attached to the Army Telegraphic Service.

Finally, the Parliament issued Law 162 of 14 May 1914, which created the Military Aeronautics School (EMA, Escola Militar de Aeronáutica), including aviation and aerostation services. The EMA would include a Staff, aeronautical troops (including the Aerostation Company and a Navy Section), and technical and support staff. The Law foresaw the existence of a Military Aeronautical Service from which the EMA would be dependent. However, while the Aeronautical Service was still not organized, the EMA would be under the inspection of the chairman of the Military Aeronautics Commission. After the formal creation of the EMA, the next steps were to implement it. One of the first steps was to train aviators to serve as the future instructors, with 11 officers being selected for that (nine from the Army and two from the Navy) and sent to several U.S., French, and British aviation schools, where they were certified as aircraft pilots. Another important step was the building of the facilities for the EMA. The study of the Military Aeronautics Commission pointed to Alverca as the best option to install the school, with Vila Nova da Rainha (a village of the Azambuja Municipality) as the second best option. Both places satisfied the requests of being located in flat grounds (allowing the installation of airfield and hangars), in the riverside (allowing the operation of seaplanes) and near the railway (facilitating the communications). Due to budget restraints, the second option was chosen, with the construction of the EMA installations starting at Vila Nova da Rainha on 15 April 1915.

On 17 July 1916, lieutenant Santos Leite performed the first Portuguese military airplane flight, in the Deperdussin B that had been offered in 1912. EMA and its first course was opened in October of the same year, with naval lieutenant aviator Sacadura Cabral as the chief of the pilots and with Major aeronautical engineer Ribeiro de Almeida as the chief of mechanics. The first students started flying in November, with Army lieutenant Sarmento de Beires being the first one.

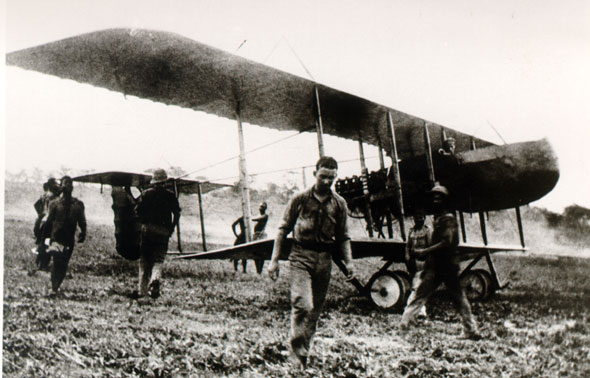
Portuguese Farman F.40 in Mozambique, during the East African Campaign of World War I

During World War I, an air unit was planned as part of the Portuguese Expeditionary Corps fighting on the Western Front, but its activation was cancelled due to the refusal from the British Government to provide the needed aircraft. With this cancellation, several of the Portuguese airmen who were to integrate that air unit, instead volunteered to fly in French aviation units, where they had the baptism by fire of the Portuguese military aviation. Serving in French squadron SPA 65, in November 1917, Captain Óscar Monteiro Torres became the first Portuguese pilot to be killed in an air combat when his SPAD S.VII was shot down after himself having shot down two German planes.

In Mozambique, in the operations against German Eastern Africa, from September 1917, the Portuguese forces included a small flight of Farman F.40 airplanes, this being one of the earliest employments of military aircraft in Africa. In 1918, a flight of Caudron G.4 was also deployed to Angola to support the Portuguese forces engaged in the South-West Africa campaign, but arrived after the end of the conflict. This flight however gave origin to a permanent air unit based in Angola.

The Portuguese Navy started to have its own aviation service on 28 September 1917, although by that time it already had flying activities performed by the Navy Section of the EMA. The Army's Military Aeronautical Service was also finally fully organized on 29 June 1918, in the scope of which the EMA was to be subdivided in separate aviation and aerostation schools and the first Portuguese aircraft factory was established.

=== The Military Aeronautics ===
By the Decree 4529 of 29 June 1918, the Portuguese Army's Military Aeronautical Service (Serviço Aeronáutico Militar) – already foreseen when the Military Aeronautics School was created in 1914 – was organised. It included the Directorate of Military Aeronautics, the Military Aeronautics Technical Commission, the Military School of Aviation, the Military School of Aerostatics, the aeronautical troops and the Aeronautical Materiel Park (PMA). The Directorate of Military Aeronautics was headed by a senior officer (pilot aviator, aerostat pilot or aeronautical engineer), who directly reported to the War Minister. The aeronautical troops would include aviation and aerostatics units, including the already existing Aerostatics Company and the newly created Composite Aviation Depot Flight (EMAD). The EMAD was responsible to train pilots and observers and to prepare the creation of future air units, being initially installed at Alverca and then transferred to Tancos, where an airfield was built to serve as its base. The PMA, installed at Alverca, was the precursor of the still existing OGMA aviation industry.

By the initiative of the local colonial authorities, the Caudron G.4 expeditionary flight that had been deployed to Angola due to World War I became a permanent air unit of the colony in 1918, as the Initial Colonial Flight, based at Huambo. This unit was increased in 1921, with the reception of Caudron G.3 reconnaissance and Breguet 14 bomber airplanes, becoming the Angola Group of Aviation Flights (GEAA), which existed until being disbanded in 1924.

On 7 February 1919, the Group of Aviation Flights "República" (GEAR) was created. This was the first permanent operational aviation unit in the Portuguese Mainland, including a combat flight – equipped with SPAD S.VII fighters – and a bombardment and observation flight – equipped with Breguet 14 bombers. It was installed at Amadora, for which an airfield was built.

In 1920, the Military School of Aviation was transferred from Vila Nova da Rainha to Granja do Marquês (Sintra Municipality), the site of what would become the still existing Sintra Air Base.

The Decree 9749 of 30 May 1924, defining that the director of the Military Aeronautics could be a colonel of any arm of the Army (and not necessarily an officer aviator), caused revolt among the aviators, culminating in the uprising of the GEAR. The uprising was quelled by other military units, with the officer aviators being arrested. These incidents led to the temporary disbandment of the Military Aeronautical Service by the Decree 9801 of 15 July 1924.

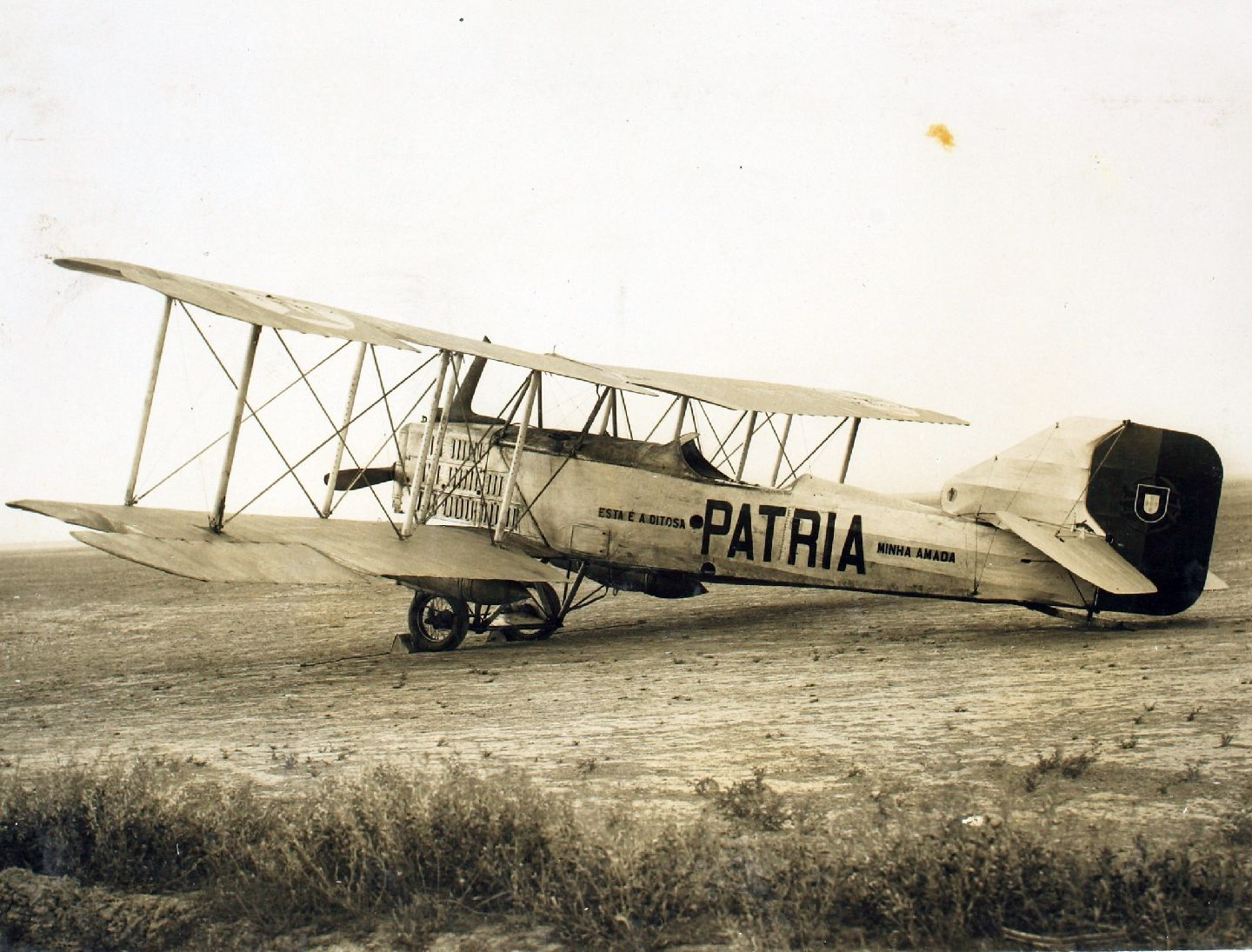
The Bréguet 16 Pátria, used by Army aviators Sarmento de Beires, Brito Pais and Manuel Gouveia in the first air connection between Portugal and Macau

By the Decree 10094 of 19 September 1924, the Military Aeronautics (AM) was reorganised, becoming a full arm of service of the Army, with the same status as the cavalry, artillery, engineering and infantry arms. The military aeronautics arm included the Inspectorate General of the Military Aeronautics, the AM Technical Commission, the aviation and aerostatics troops, the aeronautics schools and courses, the AM establishments and the AM services. The inspector general of the AM would preferably be a general or a colonel with all the conditions to be promoted to general, a graduate in one of the aeronautics courses, who would assume the role of the aeronautics commandant general in the headquarters of the field army. The tactical aviation unit continued be the flight (esquadrilha), each including seven pilots and respective aircraft, headed by a captain. Several flights could be grouped to form groups of aviation flights, each headed by a senior officer. The troops of the arm were defined at that time as being a fighter flight, a bombardment flight, an observation flight, a training and depot aviation flight and an observation aerostatics company. The aeronautics schools and courses would be the Military Aeronautics School (including an aerostatics section) and the mechanics and specialists courses functioning at the PMA. The Military Aeronautics School would only be activated in 1928, by the transformation of the Military Aviation School and the disbandment of the Military Aerostatics School. The AM establishments were the PMA and the Aeronautical Material Storage. The AM included the meteorological, the communications and liaison and the photo-topographical services.

In 1924, the fighters of the GEAR were transferred to the EMAD at Tancos, which became the No 1 Fighter Flight in 1926 and then the Independent Group of Protection and Combat Aviation (GIAPC) in 1927. In 1927, the GEAR was disbanded and gave origin to two separate units, the Information Aviation Group (GAI) and the Independent Bombardment Aviation Group (GIAB), this being transferred to Alverca.

By the Decree 11279 of 26 April 1926, the Military Aeronautics School was again divided into separate aviation and aerostation schools. With this reorganization, the Military Aviation School started to include training programs for non-officer military pilots and for civil pilots. It thus became the first civil aviation school in Portugal. In 1925, Carlos Bleck would graduate from this school, becoming the first civil pilot to receive its brevet in Portugal. In 1928, Maria de Lourdes Sá Teixeira would also graduate in the Military Aviation School, becoming the first Portuguese woman pilot.

The new organization of the Portuguese Army of 2 August 1926, established by the Decree 12017, defined that the superior technical body of each arm became a directorate of the arm. So the Directorate of the Aeronautics Arm was established, being headed by a general. This Directorate continued to have only a mere technical authority over the AM units and other establishments, which continued to be under the command of the territorial Army commands of the area where they were based. By this new organisation the PMA was transformed in the OGMA.

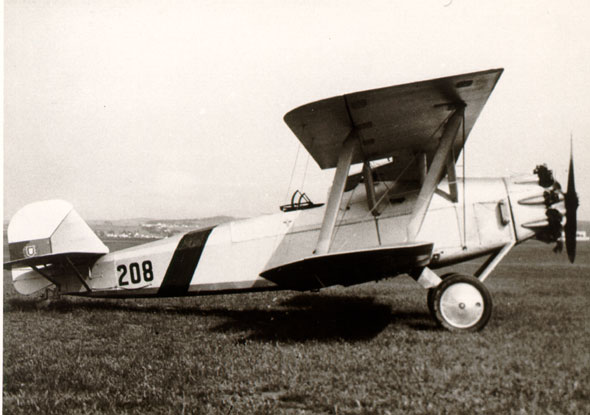
A Vickers Valparaiso III light bomber operated by the GEAR

During this period, the Portuguese Military Aeronautics aviators entered in the History of Aviation by performing a number of pioneer flights. Among these were the first flight to Macau performed by Brito Pais, Sarmento Beires and Manuel Gouveia in 1924, the first night-time flight across the Atlantic performed by Sarmento de Beires, Jorge de Castilho and Manuel Gouveia in 1927, the first flight to Goa, Portuguese India performed by Moreira Cardoso and Sarmento Pimentel in 1930, the first flight to Portuguese Guinea and Angola, performed by Carlos Bleck and Humberto da Cruz in 1931 and the first flight to Portuguese Timor performed by Humberto da Cruz and António Lobato in 1934.

In 1935, the AM performed air visits to the colonies, projecting a significant air force to Angola and to Mozambique to mark the Portuguese military presence in Africa. Taking off from the Amadora airfield, this air visit included a Junkers W 34 transport aircraft and eight Vickers Valparaiso light bombers, with 12 pilots and seven aircraft mechanics, commanded by colonel aviator Cifka Duarte.

In the scope of the readjustment of the Army units and size established by the Decree-Law 28401 of 31 December 1937, the Military Aeronautics underwent a major reorganisation. The AM would now include the Command General of the Aeronautics (with the Antiaircraft Land Defence Command attached to it), air bases, field bases, information aviation flights, fighter aviation flights, bombardment aviation flights (the flights could be independent or grouped), the Aerostatics Company (usually attached to the artillery arm), the Practical School of the arm, the Aviation Materiel Storage, the Aerostatics Materiel Storage (attached to the Aerostatics Company) and a personnel mobilisation depot (attached to the Command General). The creation of the Command General of the Aeronautics - headed by an AM brigadier or general who reported directly to the Minister of War - was one of the major features of this reorganisation. Unlike the previous superior bodies of the AM which only had technical authority over the units of the arm, the Command General now had full command over all the air forces and other bodies of the AM. This meant that the AM started to have a chain of command separated from the rest of the Army, gaining a high degree of autonomy and coming to be considered an almost independent branch. Another feature of this reorganization was the structuring of the AM in air bases, with the creation of the Sintra, Ota and Tancos air bases, as well as the Lisbon Field Base. The Practical School of Aeronautics was attached to the Sintra Air Base.

By this organisation, each fighter flight (esquadrilha de caça) would have 15 pilots (6 officers, 6 NCOs and 4 corporals) and respective aircraft, while each bombardment flight (esquadrilha de bombardeamento) would have 10 pilots (5 officers, 3 NCOs and 2 corporals) and five bombers. Besides the pilots, each flight would also include around another 70 members, including mechanics, radio-telegraphists and service support personnel. The Sintra Air Base included the Practical School of Aeronautics, with a School Group mainly equipped with Avro 626 and de Havilland Tiger Moth. Later, Sintra Air Base would also include an independent assault aviation flight equipped with Breda Ba.65 ground-attack aircraft. The Ota Air Base - inaugurated in 1940 and until then temporarily installed in Alverca - succeeded to the then disbanded GIAB and came to include a night bombardment group with Junkers Ju 52 bombers, a day bombardment group with Junkers Ju 86 bombers and a fighter flight with Gloster Gladiator fighters. The Tancos Air Base succeeded to the GIAPC and was intended to be a fighter and observation aviation unit. The Lisbon Field Base was planned to function in the facilities of the Lisbon Airport - at that time under construction, being inaugurated in 1942 - and to station a fighter flight. The growing of the Lisbon suburban area limited the use of the Amadora airfield, ending with it being deactivated and the GAI disbanded. After the inauguration of Ota, Alverca ceased to be an operational air base, becoming a logistical air field dependent from the Aviation Materiel Storage, supporting this body and also the OGMA. From 1940, the air bases became numbered as they are still today, with Sintra, Ota and Tancos, becoming respectively the No 1, No 2 and No 3 air bases.

During the Spanish Civil War (1936–1939), a number of Portuguese pilots and airmen served in the Nationalist Aviation. During this conflict, the Portuguese Government sent a Military Observation Mission to Spain intended to merely observe the new tactics and new weapon systems that were being employed, including the use of aviation and antiaircraft defences. Some members of the Mission, including some officer aviators, however ended by actively engaging in military operations. Besides these, other AM personnel volunteered as "Viriatos", these being mainly NCOs aviators who served as officers in nationalist aviation units.

By the Decree 29155 of 19 November 1938, the course of military aeronautics was created in the Army School (military academy). Until then, the future officer aviators had to graduate in the course of one of the other arms and only then be transferred to the AM.

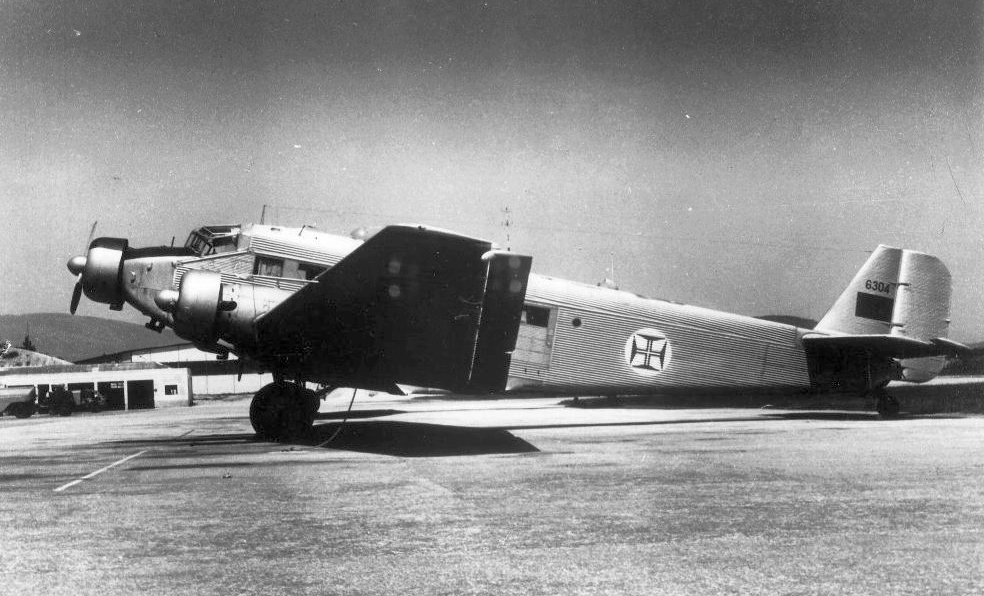
The Junkers Ju 52 were acquired as night bombers and were later used as paratrooper transports

Portugal was not directly involved in World War II, but had to defend its neutrality. The war caught the AM in the beginning of a modernisation plan that could not proceed due to the start of the conflict, meaning that it largely lacked modern aircraft. One of the major Portuguese military priorities became the deterrence of a possible invasion of the strategic Azores Islands, which were coveted both by the Axis and by the Allies, with both having plans to invade them. Adolf Hitler wanted to use the Azores as the base for the Amerika Bomber, with their seizure being included in the German planned operations Felix, Ilona and Isabella. The Allies wanted to use the Azores as an air and naval base to control the North Atlantic in the scope of the Battle of the Atlantic, having plans to invade them if the Portuguese government refused to cede their use. This invasion was part of the planned British operations Alloy, Shrapnel, Brisk, Thruster, Springboard and Lifebelt and of the US Operation Grey. Faced with the imminent danger, the Portuguese authorities decided to reinforce the Azores garrison, sending there a great part of the available Army forces and most of the AM combat aircraft, including all its fighters. In June 1941, two expeditionary fighter flights – each with 15 Gloster Gladiators – were organised and deployed, as well as five Ju 52 bombers. One of the fighter flights and the bombers became based at Santana airfield (Rabo de Peixe), São Miguel Island and the other fighter flight became based at Achada airfield, Terceira Island (soon transferred to the newly built Lajes airfield). In October 1941, the AM received Curtiss 75 Mohawk fighters, with 12 forming a third expeditionary fighter flight to the Azores, being stationed at Rabo de Peixe. In 1942, the Rabo de Peixe and the Lajes airfields became, respectively, the No 4 and No 5 air bases.

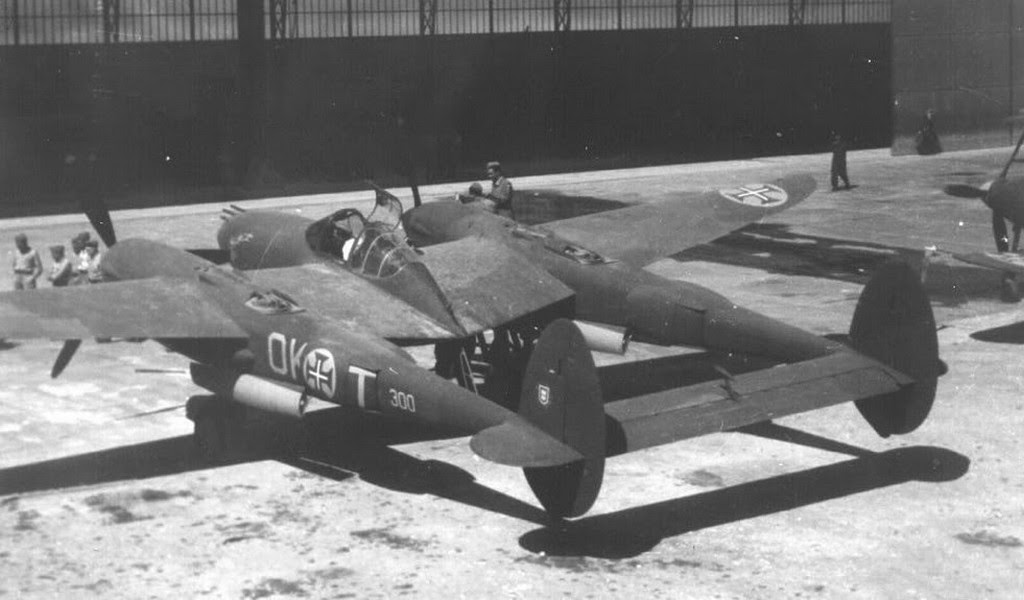
A Lockheed P-38 Lightning confiscated and incorporated into the AM

The sending of all the few available AM fighters to the Azores meant that Mainland Portugal remained without air defence. This issue would be gradually solved from 1943, thanks to the good relations of the Portuguese authorities with the Allies and the granting of air facilities at Lajes for the operation of anti-submarine aircraft. The AM then started to receive modern fighters including Bell P-39 Airacobra, Hawker Hurricane, Supermarine Spitfire and Bristol Blenheim bombers (which replaced the Junkers Ju 86). The fighter and bomber flights that were formed with them were identified by a two-letter code that was painted on the fuselages. By the end of World War II, the AM included the BA1, Sintra as a training unit, the BA2, Ota with fighter flights MR (Spitfire), RL (Spitfire), XZ (Spitfire) and OK (Airacobra) and with bomber flight ZE (Blenheim), the BA3, Tancos with Information and Reconnaissance Group (Westland Lysander) and Fighter Flight GL (Hurricane), BA4, Rabo de Peixe, with expeditionary fighter flights No 1 (Gloster Gladiator) and No 2 (Mohawk) and with the Ju 52 flight (used mainly in the air transport between Azores islands), BA5, Lajes with Expeditionary Fighter Flight No 2 (Gloster Gladiator), Lisbon Field with Fighter Flight VX (Hurricane) and Transport Aircraft Section (Consolidated B-24 Liberator, Lockheed Hudson and Douglas C-47) and Espinho airfield with Fighter Flight RV (Hurricane). The Lajes Air Base largely contributed to the Allied victory in Europe, first in its use by the British Royal Air Force in the elimination of the German submarine threat in the North Atlantic and then in its use by the United States Army Air Force (USAAF) in the air connection between the US and Europe and North Africa, enabling it to reduce the time of flight and largely increase the number of logistic flights that were able to supply the troops fighting the Axis.

Already after the war, by the Ordinance 12194 of 19 December 1947, the AM suffered its last major re-adjustment of its units still under the Army tutelage. As part of this, the BA4 (Santana Air Base) was disbanded, with its aeronautical facilities being transferred to the Ministry of Communications to become the civil airport of São Miguel Island. With this disbandment, Lajes was re-designated "No 4 Air Base (BA4)". By this time, Lajes was already one of the major air bases of the AM, including the longest runway in the world and well developed support facilities that included a seaport and a military hospital. From 1945, it was open to civil air traffic, serving as the civil airport of Terceira island. The AM activities operated from Lajes became increasingly focused on maritime search and rescue operations, using Boeing SB-17 Flying Fortress and Douglas C-54 Skymaster aircraft. Since 1944, its main user had become however not the Portuguese aviation, but the USAAF. Besides its importance for the Allied victory in World War II, Lajes would continue to be strategically crucial for the US Military in future conflicts, especially in the Cold War, Berlin airlift, Yom Kippur War and Gulf War. In the scope of the re-organization of 1947, the Monte Real airfield (future Monte Real Air Base) – at that time under construction – became dependent from the BA1, Sintra.

Portugal joined NATO in 1949 as one of its founders. With this joining, the AM increasingly came under the influence of the US air forces, adopting many of its standards.

Since its early beginnings, the AM constantly evolved towards an increasing autonomy, with an implicit aim to become an independent branch of service. Important milestones in that journey had been the granting of the status of arm to the AM in 1924 and its operational autonomy regarding the rest of the Army achieved in 1937. By this time, there was a unanimous opinion that the conditions for the AM to completely separate from the Army and to become an independent branch of the Armed Forces had been obtained. Finally, on 1 July 1952, the AM was established as an independent branch, at the same time controversially integrating the much smaller naval aviation. This branch kept initially the designation of "Military Aeronautics", but from 28 December 1956 it became officially designated "Air Force".

=== The Naval Aviation ===
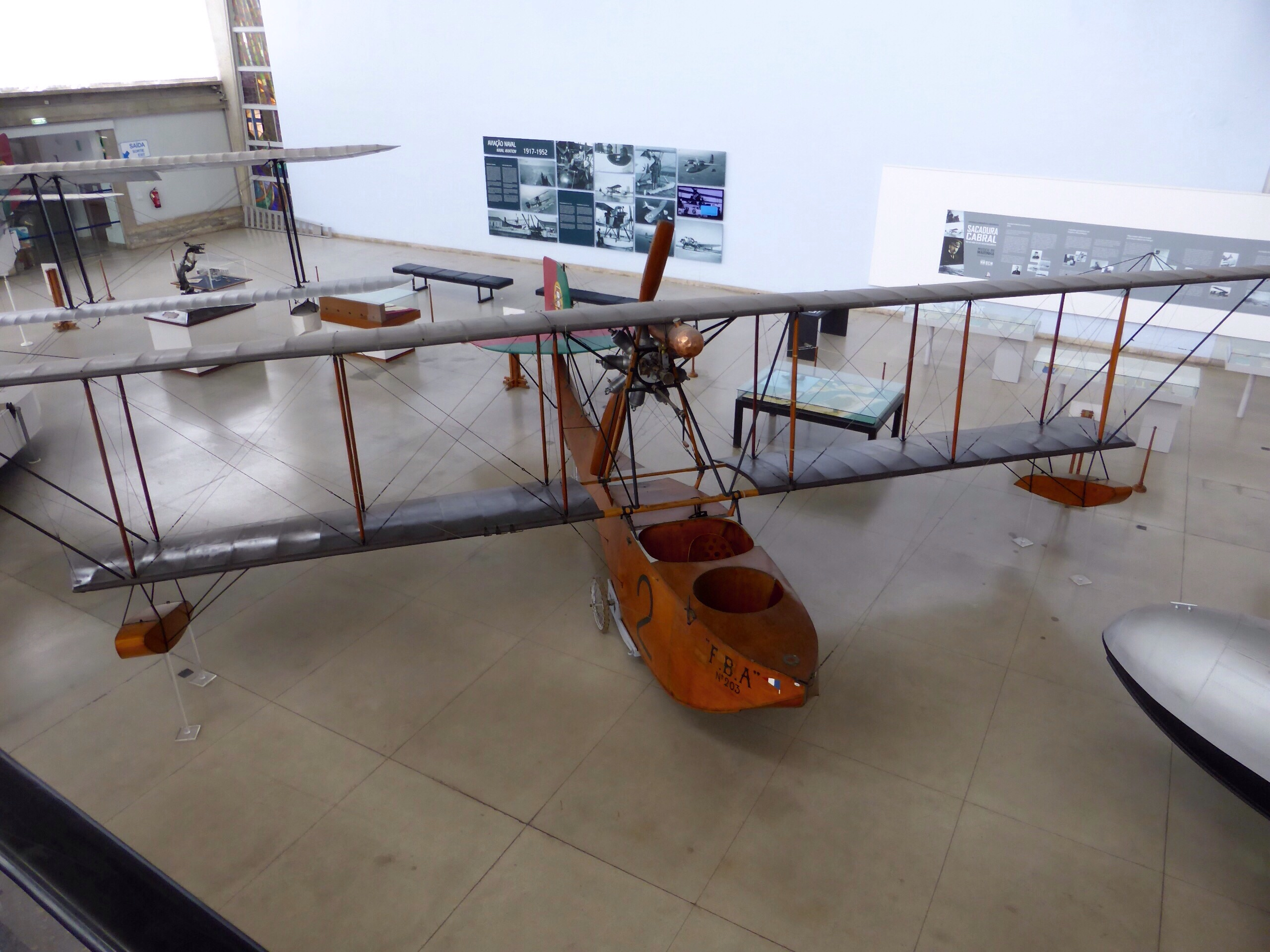
One of the first naval aviation's FBA type B flying boats, preserved at the Navy Museum

Besides the former Military Aeronautics, the former Portuguese Naval Aviation was the other ancestor of the present Portuguese Air Force.

The aviation activities performed by the Portuguese Navy started with the establishment of the Military School of Aeronautics (EMA). Naval officers Artur de Sacadura Cabral and António Joaquim Caseiro were part of the group of the eleven first Portuguese military aviation pilots, with the first one becoming the first chief of the pilot instructors of the EMA. The EMA included a Navy Section, which received the first naval aircraft (two FBA Type B flying boats) in January 1917. These aircraft started flying activities in March of the same year.

The Navy's Aviation Service (Serviço de Aviação da Armada) was created by the Decree 3395 of 28 September 1917, with the first naval air station being activated at the Bom Sucesso dock, near the Belém Tower in Lisbon. In the scope of World War I, the flying boats started the performance of anti-submarine patrols off Lisbon harbor. During the War, additional naval air stations were installed at São Jacinto peninsula, Aveiro (operated together with the French naval aviation), at Horta, Azores, at Ponta Delgada, Azores (operated by the United States Navy) and at Culatra Island, Algarve (never fully activated). By the Decree 3743 of 5 January 1918, the Navy's Aviation Service became the Naval Aeronautics Services (Serviços de Aeronáutica Naval).

On 23 August 1918, a Tellier T.3 flying boat of the naval aviation - that was chasing an enemy submarine spotted from Roca Cape - was lost at sea with the death of its crew. At the end of World War I, the naval aviation was operating 18 flying boats (FBA type B, Donnet-Denhaut D.D.8 and Tellier T.3), mainly from the Bom Sucesso Naval Air Station. With the end of the conflict, the São Jacinto and the Ponta Delgada air stations were transferred to the Portuguese Navy, together with some of its materiel, including ex-French Donnet-Denhaut D.D.8 and Georges Levy G.L.40 flying boats.

In 1919, in the scope of the civil conflict between Republicans and Monarchist, the naval aviation bombs and disables a section of the Porto-Lisbon railway near Espinho, in order to cut the supplies of the Monarchist forces that were advancing to the South. This was the first aerial bombing performed by the Portuguese military aviation.

During the 1920s, the naval aviation took its share of pioneer flights, mainly by the initiative of Sacadura Cabral. In 1922, the Sacadura Cabral and Gago Coutinho entered the History of the World Aviation by performing the first aerial crossing of the South Atlantic.

Due to the frequent piracy attacks to the local navigation and the civil conflicts affecting China, in 1927 the Portuguese Navy reinforced its station at Macau, including an air force of Fairey III floatplanes, with a naval air station being installed at Taipa Island. This air force was deactivated in 1932, but it would be reactivated in 1937 due to the Civil War and the Japanese invasion of China.

The naval aviation and the only ever existing Portuguese aircraft carrier had an important role in subduing the Army officers' rebellion against the government of the National Dictatorship, which occurred in April 1931. Operating from the Cubando cargo ship, transformed in an improvised seaplane carrier, four CAMS 37 flying boats of the naval aviation carried out an important task of reconnaissance and support of the Government's landing forces.

Through the reorganization of the Naval Aeronautics, established by Decree-law 27059 of 30 September 1936, the operational force of the service became the Navy Air Forces (FAA, Forças Aéreas da Armada).

During World War II, the naval aviation participated in the military effort to defend the strategic Azores islands, that was under a serious threat of being invaded both by the Axis and by the Allies. Grumman G-21 and Grumman G-44 amphibious aircraft were used in the coastal patrols and also in the search and rescue of survivors from ships that were torpedoed by submarines. In 1943, a land-based naval air strike unit was activated at the Lisbon Airport, being initially equipped with Bristol Blenheim light bombers, latter replaced by Bristol Beaufighter.

After Portugal became one of co-founders of NATO, the naval aviation received Curtiss SB2C Helldiver dive bombers in 1950, organizing with them, an anti-submarine warfare unit, initially based at the São Jacinto Naval Air Station. With the inauguration of the new Naval Air Station at Montijo, in 1953, the anti-submarine units would start to operate from this base, already equipped with Lockheed PV-2 Harpoon, latter replaced by Lockheed P-2 Neptune.

By that time however, the Portuguese naval aviation was near its end. In the scope of the Portuguese deep military reforms of the late 1940s and 1950s, which included the integration of the several branches of the Armed Forces, placing them under a unified chain of command headed by the Minister of National Defense and the Chief of the General Staff of the Armed Forces, the process of creating an independent air branch was also at an advanced stage. In 1952, the Government advanced with the integration of the naval aviation in the new air branch of the Armed Forces (which was initially designated "Military Aeronautics" and only later "Portuguese Air Force"), but keeping it as an autonomous entity inside that branch, partially linked to the Navy. This entity was the Aeronaval Forces (Forças Aeronavais), which included the roles, units, aircraft and personnel of the former Naval Aeronautics. The Aeronaval Forces ended however to be disbanded and fully integrated in the Air Force in 1958.

=== Army Artillery Light aviation ===
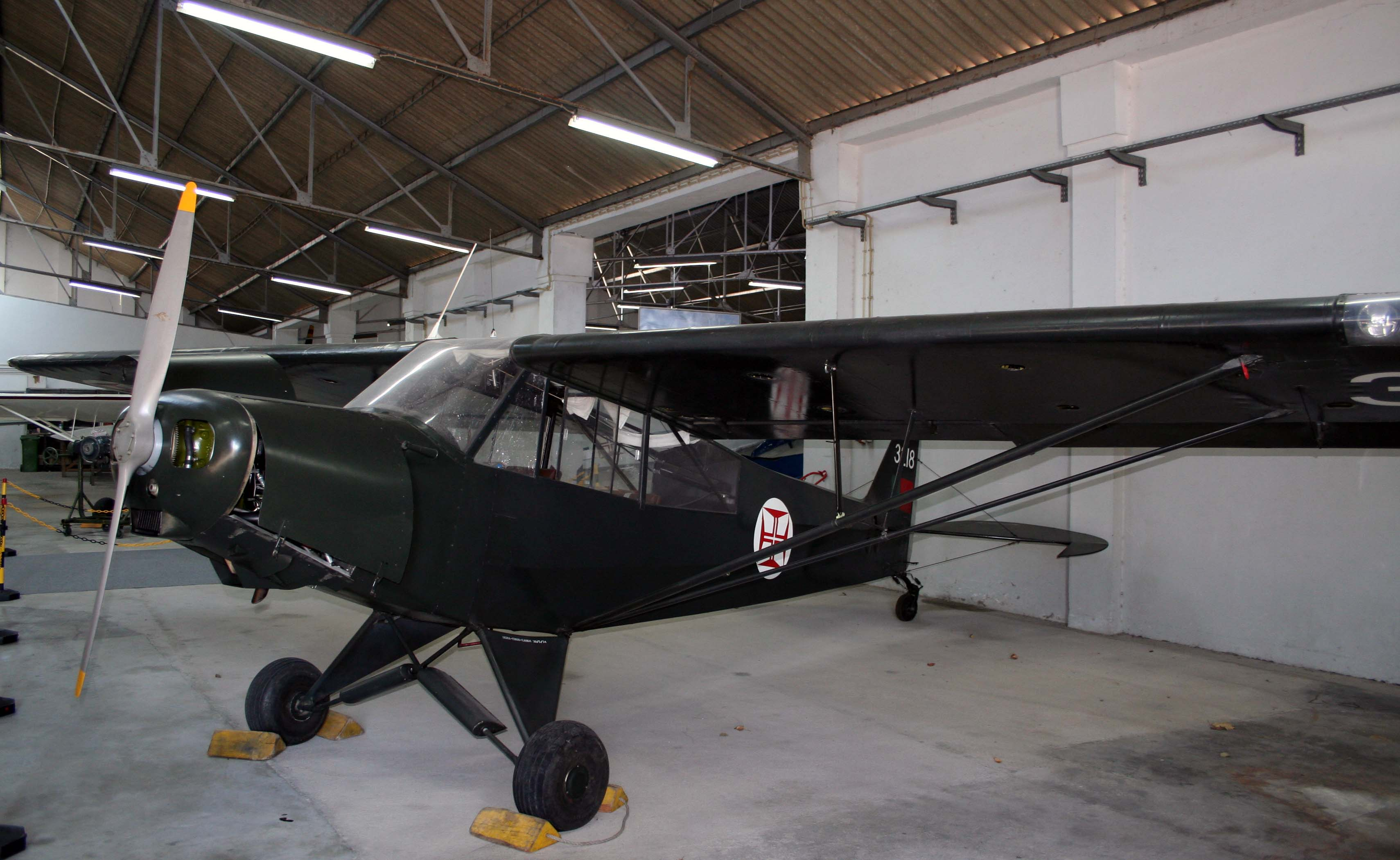
Piper L-21 Super Cub used by the Portuguese Army in the artillery observation role

The separation of the Military Aeronautics from the Portuguese Army did not bring an end to the aviation in this branch, as the Army activated and maintained for a brief period of time a small separate aviation service.

This service originated in the need identified by the Army to continue to keep an aviation service equipped with light aircraft under its direct control, for the artillery air observation role. Plans were then made to create the artillery observation light aviation as part of the artillery arm and so separated from the Military Aeronautics.

In 1952 - at the same time that the Military Aeronautics was becoming independent, ending its links to the Army - the Army Minister Abranches Pinto boosted the activation of this light aviation service, with the acquisition of 22 Piper L-21 Super Cub observation and liaison aircraft and the sending of artillery officers to be trained as pilot-observers at the US Army aviation schools. At the same time, an airfield was built in the grounds of the Army Artillery School at Vendas Novas, to serve as the base for this unit. Eight of the L-21 became permanently based at Vendas Novas, being piloted by the few available pilot-observers of the artillery arm and used in the observation and direction of artillery fire against targets beyond the visual range of the ground observers. The remaining aircraft were only used in large Army maneuvers, when they were piloted by Air Force pilots. By the influence of the US Army aviation doctrine, the concept of Army light aviation evolved and it was anticipated that it would also be equipped with helicopters and it would have other missions beyond the artillery observation.

The process of the raising of the Army light aviation was however terminated in 1955, with its mission being assumed by the Air Force. The Army L-21 were then transferred to the Air Force, where they formed an Army cooperation flight based at the Tancos Air Base.

=== The Independent Air Branch ===
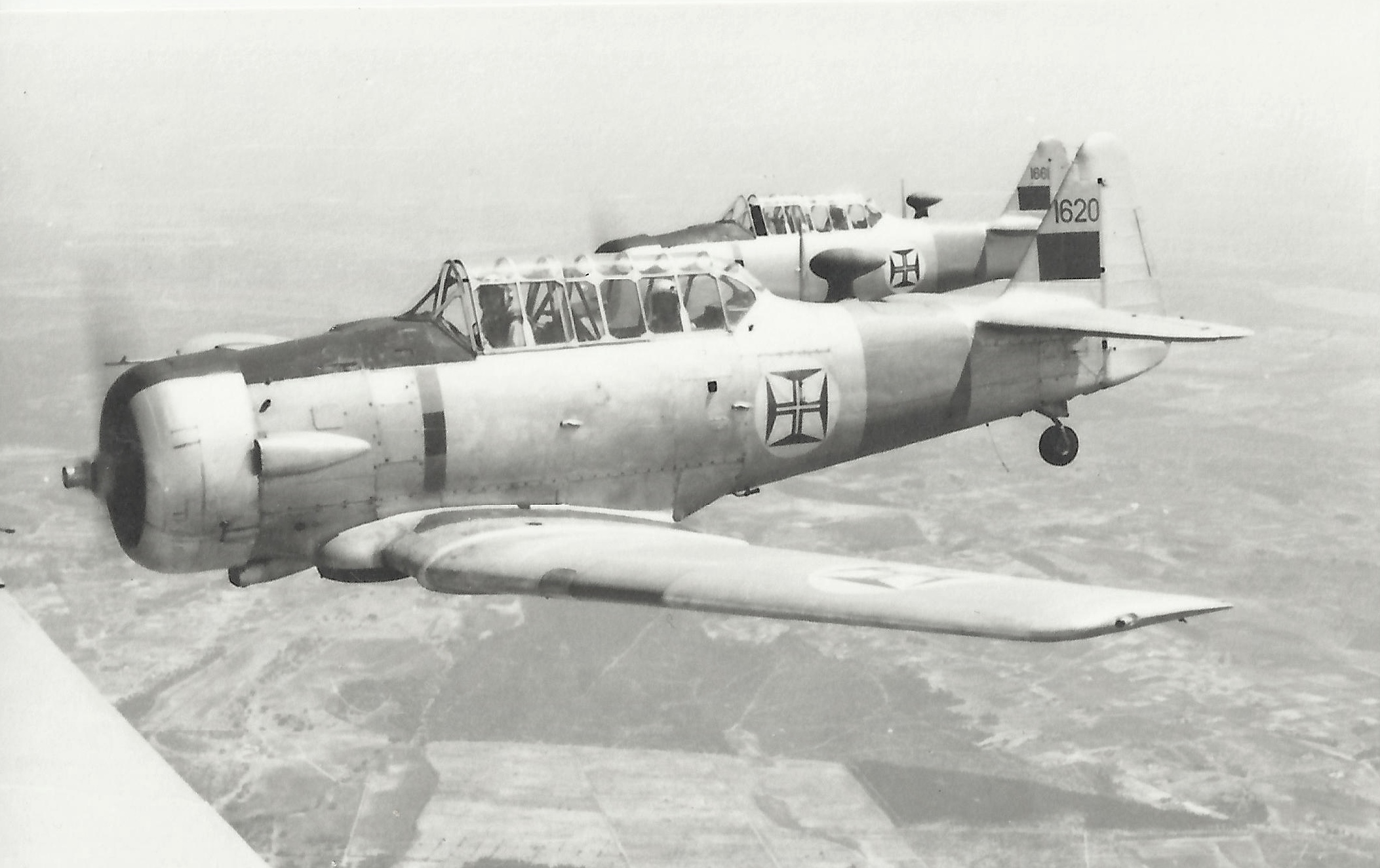
The North American T-6 Texan provided training for FAP pilots

The creation of the independent air branch of the Portuguese Armed Forces occurred in the scope of the deep military and defence reforms implemented in Portugal, arising from the lessons learned in World War II, from the Portuguese participation in NATO and from the Cold War. By the Decree-law 37909 of 1 August 1950, the Portuguese Government was reorganised and started to include the role of Minister of National Defense and, under this, the role of Undersecretary of State for the Aeronautics (Subsecretário de Estado da Aeronáutica or SEA) to be only filled upon the reorganisation of the air forces. The status of the Government member responsible for the air forces is however inferior to those responsible for the Navy and the Army, who keep the rank of ministers. Besides foreseeing already the existence of an independent air force, this act created de facto the Portuguese Armed Forces as an integrated organisation encompassing the Navy, the Army and the foreseen third branch, establishing an unified chain of command for all the branches, under the military coordination of the Chief of the General Staff of the Armed Forces. An independent air branch is finally created by the Portuguese Parliament through the Law 2055 of 27 May 1952, at this time, maintaining the designation "Military Aeronautics", inherited from the former Army aviation. The Military Aeronautics was defined as being aimed at the defense of the air space of the Portuguese homeland and of its overseas territories and at cooperating with the land and naval forces. At Government level, it was administered by the Undersecretary of State functioning in the Government Presidency Office, under the responsibility of the Minister of National Defence. The SEA included the Office of the Under-Secretary of State, the Directorate General and the Aeronautical High Command. At this time, no specific incumbent was appointed Under-Secretary of State for the Aeronautics, with the Minister of National Defence Santos Costa temporarily assuming the direct management of the SEA. The military head of the Military Aeronautics was the Chief of Staff of the Air Forces, who had the rank of general, reported directly to the Under-Secretary of State and directed both the Directorate General of the SEA and the General Command of the Air Forces.

By a curious coincidence, the President of Portugal at the time was general aviator Craveiro Lopes. So, in promulgating Law 2055, Craveiro Lopes indirectly caused himself to cease to be an Army officer and become an officer of the new air branch.

During 1952, the Law 2055 is complemented by a number of other legislative acts intended to refine the framework of the organisation of the air branch, including the Law 2056 of 2 June (defining the recruiting and military services in the air forces), the Decree-law 38 805 of 28 June (defining the organisation and responsibility of the SEA) and the Decree-law 39 071 of 31 December (defining the general norms relative to the personnel of the Military Aeronautics). Namely, the Decree-law 38 805 establishes the 1 July 1952 as the day for the transference of the air assets, bodies and infrastructures of the Army and Navy ministries to the SEA, this date marking so the effective creation of the independent air branch.

The following Army units were transferred to the Air Force:

- General Command of the Aeronautics, Lisbon - integrated in the SEA and disbanded at 9 September 1952;
- Aeronautics Materiel General Storage, Alverca
- Aeronautics Materiel General Workshops (OGMA), Alverca
- Independent Fighter Aviation Group, Espinho - with two squadrons of Hawker Hurricane fighters. Its aeronautical infrastructures became the Base Airfield No. 1 in 1953, being deactivated in 1955;
- Air Base No. 1, Sintra - serving as the Military School of Aeronautics and focused on training;
- Air Base No. 2, Ota - with two fighter squadrons equipped with the recently received Republic F-47 Thunderbolt, as well as squadrons of Supermarine Spitfire and Junkers Ju 52/3m. It would soon receive the first Portuguese jet aircraft, forming the Operational Fighter Aviation Group, which included two fighter squadrons with Republic F-84G and a fighter training squadron with Lockheed T-33. This unit would also include the Dragões and São Jorge flight demonstration teams. After the activation of the Monte Real Air Base, Ota would cease to be an operating fighter base and become a training base, housing the Air Force specialist technicians training unit from 1960;
- Air Base No. 3, Tancos - with Lysander and Hawker Hurricane squadrons, which were being phased out. It would receive the F-47 squadrons transferred from Ota, until their disbandment. It would become an Army cooperation and paratrooper training and transport base, equipped with light aircraft, paratrooper transport planes and helicopters;
- Air Base No. 4, Lajes - supporting transport, reconnaissance and search and rescue missions, with a composite squadron equipped with Boeing SB-17G Flying Fortress, C-54, and the first helicopter operated by the Portuguese Armed Forces, the Sikorsky UH-19;
- All other aeronautical infrastructures depending from the Army (including the military facilities at the Lisbon Airport, home of the Military Air Transports units and which became the Base Airfield No. 1 in 1955 and the Monte Real airfield, which would be inaugurated as the Air Base No. 5 in 1959, becoming the main operating base of the Portuguese fighter aviation).

From the Navy, a number of units were also transferred as follows:

- High Command of the Navy Air Forces, Lisbon - integrated in the SEA and disbanded at 9 September 1952;
- Directory of Naval Aeronautics, Lisbon - co-located with the previous, also integrated in the SEA and disbanded at 9 September 1952;
- Admiral Gago Coutinho Naval Aviation School, São Jacinto, Aveiro - being equipped mainly with D.H. Tiger Mouth and North American SNJ-4 and continuing to serve as the anti-submarine training base of the Air Force. Provisionally serving also as operational naval air station, stationing the Curtiss SB2C Helldiver anti-submarine unit. From December 1953, it became also known as No. 5 Air Base, latter becoming the No. 2 Base Airfield and then the No. 7 Air Base;
- Lisbon Naval Air Station, Lisbon - under transference from the Bom Sucesso Dock and Lisbon Airport facilities to the new air base at Montijo, where it became the Commander Sacadura Cabral Naval Air Station. The base was initially equipped with flying boats moved from Bom Sucesso (including Grumman G-21B and G-44) and with land based aircraft moved from the former Flight B at Lisbon Airport (including Airspeed Oxford and Beechcraft AT-11/D-18S). It became the air-naval cooperation base of the Air Force, being home of its PV-2 Harpoon and latter P2V Neptune anti-submarine squadrons. From December 1953, it became also known as No 6 Air Base;
- All other aeronautical infrastructures depending from the Navy

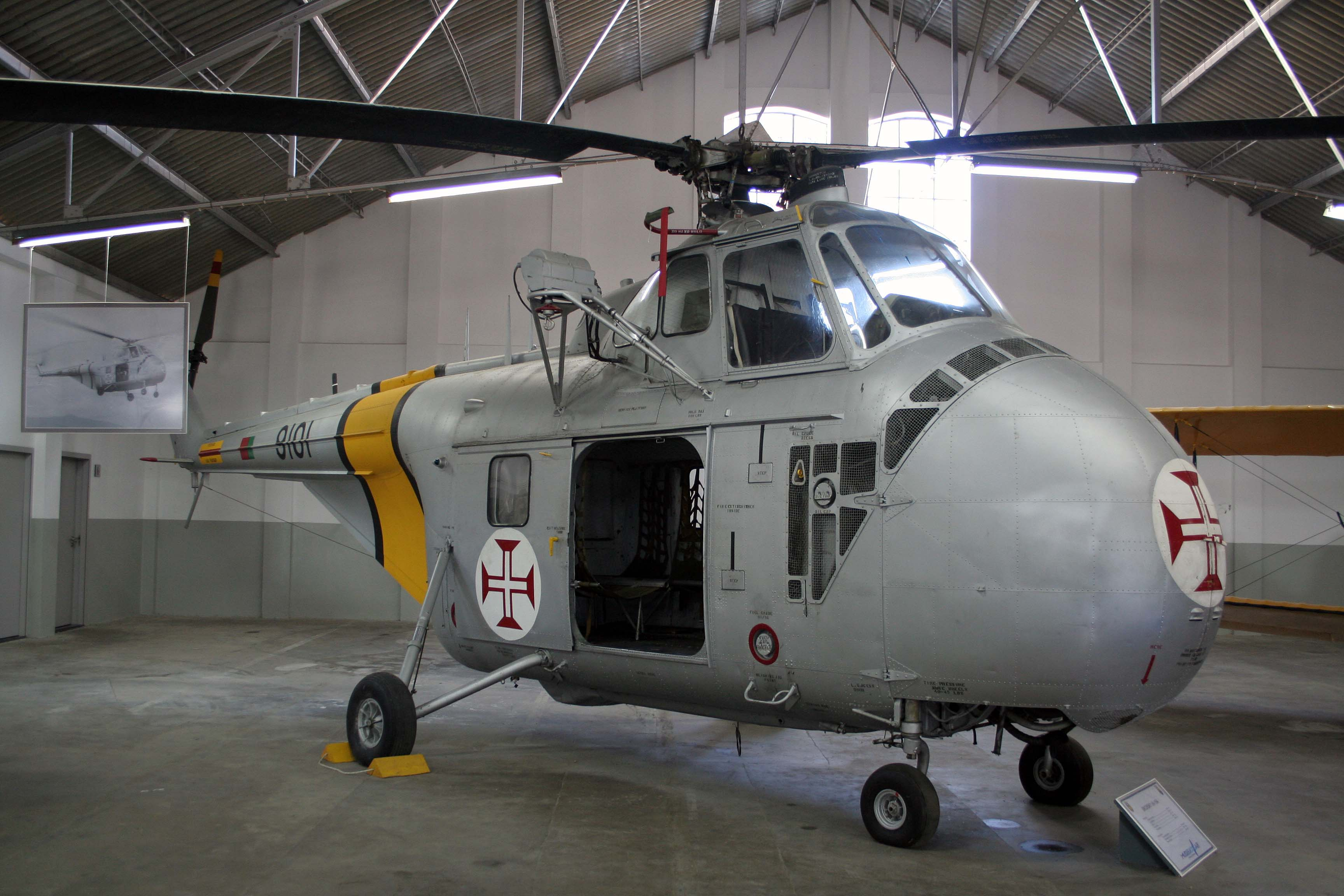
The first helicopter operated by Portugal was the Sikorsky H-19

The Military Aeronautics would include air forces for independent operations, air forces of cooperation and training units. The air forces for independent operations included the fighter, warning and control, search and rescue, transport and eventually bombardment units. The air forces of cooperation included units of cooperation with land forces and units of cooperation with naval forces, namely in the defence of the maritime communications against submarines. These air forces could be assigned, respectively, to the Army and to the Navy, with the air forces of cooperation with the naval forces being available to the Navy for their employment in case of war and for operational training in times of peace.

The air forces were under the command of the General Command of the Air Forces - headed by the Chief of Staff of the Air Forces - and would normally be grouped in air bases, with each air base usually stationing squadrons or groups of squadrons of the same type. Under the General Command of the Air Forces, two subordinate commands were established, these being the Command of the Operational Air Forces and the Air Forces Instruction and Training Command.

In campaign, the air forces would constitute formations designated "air forces in operations", which would include groups headed by lieutenant-colonels, squadrons headed by majors and flights headed by captains. The newly created squadron (esquadra) replaced the flight (esquadrilha) as the main tactical air unit, with a standard fighter squadron including usually 25 aircraft, comparing with the 15 of the previous fighter flights. It was foreseen that the groups could be grouped in air groups (agrupamentos) or regiments headed by colonels and in air brigades headed by generals. The supreme command of all air forces in operations would be assumed by the Chief of Staff of the Air Forces.

The personnel of the Military Aeronautics was divided in two separate branches, these being the Airland Forces (Forças Aeroterrestres) and the Aeronaval Forces (Forças Aeronavais), with these last being responsible to assure the air forces of cooperation with the naval forces. While the Airland Forces were fully integrated in the Military Aeronautics, the Aeronaval Forces had a special status, continuing to be partially linked to the Navy. This branch was made of naval personnel detached from the Navy in extraordinary deployment, except the sergeants aviators and some other specialised personnel non existent in the Navy. The special status of these personnel meant, that besides continuing to be part of the Navy, their members had naval ranks and wear naval uniforms.

The third anniversary of the independent air branch was marked by, probably, the most serious disaster of the Portuguese military aviation. On 1 July 1955, a formation of 12 F-84G jets was flying over several Portuguese cities, as part of the anniversary commemorations, when it entered in a group of low clouds over Coimbra, with eight of the aircraft ending up in hitting the Carvalho mountains near Vila Nova de Poiares, causing the death of the eight pilots.

=== The air branch becomes the Portuguese Air Force ===
On 7 July 1955, Kaulza de Arriaga was appointed to be the first Undersecretary of State of Aeronautics.

After the experience acquired in four years as an independent branch of the Armed Forces, the air forces suffer an important reorganisation, through the Decree-law 40949 of 26 December 1956. In the scope of this reorganisation, the branch receives the alternative name of "Air Force", which will prevail over "Military Aeronautics", with this last designation falling into disuse. From then on, the branch will be known as the "Portuguese Air Force" (FAP, Força Aérea Portuguesa).

The title of the military head of the FAP slightly changes from "Chief of Staff of the Air Forces" to "Chief of Staff of the Air Force". The General Command of the Air Forces and the Directorate General of the Under-Secretariat of State were disbanded, being replaced by the Air Force Staff (EMFA, Estado-Maior da Força Aérea).

The air regions and zones - that were already foreseen when the independent air branch was created - are finally created, with the transitory Command of the Operational Air Forces and the Air Forces Instruction and Training Command being disbanded. In its respective territories of jurisdiction, each air region command is responsible for the mobilisation of personnel and other resources for the Air Force, for the air defence, for the air cooperation with land and naval forces and for the air transports. The air zones commands are responsible for the air defense, cooperation with the land and naval forces and other functions delegated on them by its parent air region command. The Portuguese national metropolitan and overseas territory is divided in the following air regions and zones:

- 1st Air Region, Lisbon - covering Continental Portugal, the Azores, Madeira, Portuguese Guinea and Cape Verde;
  - Continental Portugal and Madeira Air Zone - commanded directly by the 1st Air Region command;
  - Azores Air Zone - covering the Azores isles;
  - Cape Verde Air Zone - covering the Cape Verde islands and latter also the Portuguese Guinea, becoming the Cape Verde and Guinea Air Zone.
- 2nd Air Region, Luanda - covering Angola and São Tomé and Príncipe;
- 3rd Air Region, Lourenço Marques - covering Mozambique, Portuguese India, Macau and Portuguese Timor.

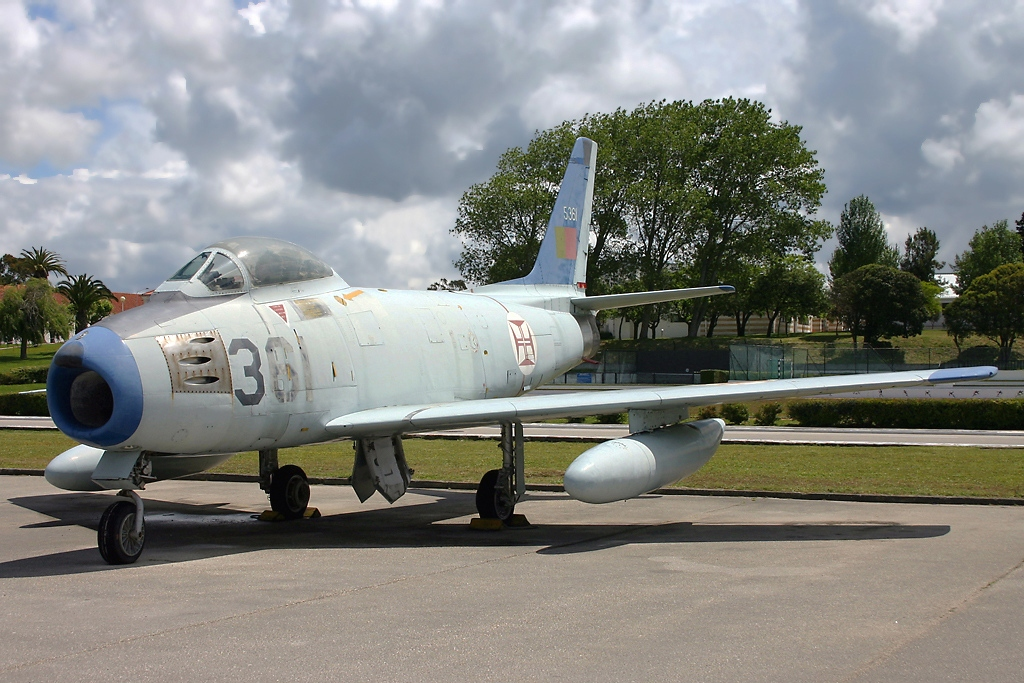
F-86F Sabre of the FAP's 51 Squadron, based at Monte Real from 1959

Meanwhile, the foreseen warning system is developed and their infrastructures built, becoming the Air Defence System (SDA, Sistema de Defesa Aérea). Originally, it was planned to include a central command and a network of radar sites. The first radar site at Montejunto is activated in 1955 and the central command infrastructures in Monsanto, Lisbon are activated in 1956, with other radar sites being activated in the following years. The final organisation and architecture of the SDA are clarified in 1957. It comes to include:

- GDACI 1 - No 1 Detection, Warning and Interception Direction Group:
  - 10 Squadron, Monsanto Mounts, Lisbon - Sector Operations Centre;
  - 11 Squadron, Montejunto Mountains - detection and control radar station;
  - 12 Squadron, Pilar peak, Paços de Ferreira - detection and control radar station;
  - 13 Squadron, Serra da Estrela peak - detection and control radar outpost;
  - 14 Squadron, Fóia Mountain - detection and control radar station (foreseen, but only activated many years later)

The GDACI 1 covered Continental Portugal and was under the command of the 1st Air Region. A GDACI 2 under the command of the Azores Air Zone, with radar sites on Terceira Island (21 Squadron) and Santa Maria Island (22 Squadron), was also foreseen, but it was never activated.

The possible integration of units of paratroopers in the air forces was already foresee in the legislation which created the independent air branch in 1952. On 9 July 1955, a group of 188 Portuguese military personnel receives the paratrooper brevet in the Spanish Military Parachute School at Alcantarilla, in the graduation ceremony these elements being awarded with green berets, becoming the first beret users in the Portuguese Armed Forces. By the Decree 40 395 of 23 November 1955, the Portuguese Paratroopers are finally organised. The Paratroopers were part of the SEA, but were under the command of the Ministry of the Army for the purpose of its employment in the ground and respective training. The initial unit - the Paratroopers Caçadores Battalion - was activated on 1 January 1956, being barracked at Tancos, with the nearby Air Base No 3 being responsible to provide the means for its air transportation and launching. The organisation of these troops would be adjusted by the Decree 42 073 of 31 December 1958, ceasing its links to the Army, with the Paratroopers becoming under the complete command of the Air Force, where they will stay until 1993.

The organisation of the FAP suffers an adjustment defined by the Decree-law 41492 of 31 December 1957. Among other adjustments, this act terminated with the separation between the Land Air Forces and the Naval Air Forces branches, creating an unified establishment for the FAP. While the officers aviators of the Land Air Forces were automatically integrated in the unified establishment, the officers aviators of the Naval Air Forces would only integrate in it if they expressly required, returning to the Navy establishment if not. Many of the naval aviators opted to maintain themselves in the Navy, with some of them remaining however in extraordinary deployment in the Air Force until reaching the limit of age or rank. The last remaining Navy aviators would leave FAP in the early 1960s.

In 1958, FAP started to receive its first North American F-86F Sabre transonic jet fighters. Captain Moura Pinto does the first F-86F flight on 22 September 1958 and, two days later, the same pilot does the first Portuguese supersonic flight, by doing a dive with one of the Sabres. The F-86F are transitorily based at Ota, while the planned fighter air base at Monte Real was still under construction.

In the late 1950s and already partially foreseeing the conflicts that would arise in the Portuguese overseas territories, the FAP increased its effort to implement itself in those territories, as it was planned since its creation as an independent branch. In April 1959, marking the return of the Portuguese military aviation to Africa, the FAP carried away the Exercise Himba. This included the deployment of six C-54 Skymaster, two Douglas C-47 Dakota and six Lockheed PV-2 Harpoon aircraft to Angola, as well as a force of 80 paratroopers. In Luanda, with the local population assisting, this force carried away simulations of airborne assaults and of bombardment and attacks against ground targets. Similar demonstrations were also done in other cities of Angola.

As part of this effort, FAP developed the Military Air Transport (TAM, Transportes Aéreos Militares) in order to assure the military air connection between European Portugal and the overseas territories. Initially, already existing C-47 and C-54 aircraft were used for this role, although with limitations. FAP then acquired the more capable Douglas DC-6 in the early 1960s. However, an effective air connection with the Overseas would only be implemented in the early 1970s, when FAP was able to acquire Boeing 707 intercontinental jets and with them finally replace an important part of maritime transport.

In the late 1950s, FAP also initiated the activation of the 2nd and 3rd air regions and of the Cape Verde and Guinea Air Zone. A network of bases and other airfields were implemented in Angola, Mozambique, Portuguese Guinea, Cape Verde and São Tomé and Príncipe, in the early 1960s, with a number of flying units being installed in those bases.

On 4 October 1959, the important Air Base No 5 at Monte Real was inaugurated, stationing the 501 Operational Group, which included the F-86F squadrons transferred from Ota. From then on and until today, Monte Real will become the main operating base of the FAP's fighter aviation squadrons. Other air bases in construction were that of Beja (Air Base no 11) and that of Ovar (Maneuver Airfield no 1), which would be inaugurated, respectively, in 1964 and 1966. These two bases would not have Portuguese air assets permanently based there for many years, the first stationing jet training air units of the German Air Force and the other serving as a NATO forward naval air base.

In 1961, the Air Force becomes again a pioneer amongst the Portuguese Armed Forces with the recruitment of the first female military personnel, these being the paratrooper nurses. These female paratrooper nurses would soon be employed in combat operations in Africa.

=== The Air Force in the Overseas War ===
From 1961 to 1975, the Portuguese Air Force was deeply engaged in the three theaters of war of the Portuguese Overseas War, both with aviation and paratrooper forces. In the Overseas War, the Air Force had both strategic and tactical air missions.

The strategic mission consisted in the inter-territorial air connections between the Metropole (European Portugal) and the Portuguese Guinea, Angola and Mozambique theatres, using DC-6 and later Boeing 707 aircraft. After acquiring the Boeing 707 in the early 1970s, the Air Force was able take a large share of the transport missions that until then were made through the use of merchant ships, reducing the connection time between the different territories.

The tactical missions undertaken by the Portuguese Air Force in the three theatres of war were:

- Attack missions (independent, reconnaissance, support and escort), using F-86, F-84 and Fiat G.91 fighters, PV-2 Harpoon and B-26 Invader bombers and North American T-6 light attack aircraft. Armed helicopters and Dornier Do 27 light aircraft armed with rockets were also used in some of these missions.
- Reconnaissance missions (visual and photo), using light aircraft like the OGMA/Auster D.5 and the Do 27, but also using B-26, PV-2, P-2 Neptune, C-47 and other aircraft prepared for air photo reconnaissance;
- Tactical transportation missions (assault, manoeuver, general and casualty evacuation), using Alouette II, Alouette III and Puma helicopters, OGMA/Auster D.5, Do-27 and other light aircraft and Nord Noratlas and C-47 heavy aircraft;
- Other missions (liaison, control, operational air command post, VIP transportation and others), using several types of aircraft.

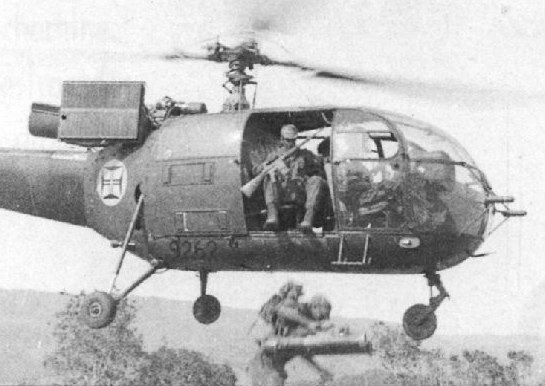
Paratroopers jump from a FAP's Alouette III in an air assault operation in Angola, 1960s

The missions were carried away from a well developed network of air bases and other airfields. By the early 1970s, in the Angolan theatre there was a central air base, two sector air bases, eight satellite airfields and nine other airfields. In the Guinean theatre there was a central air base, three satellite airfields and other three airfields. In the Mozambican theatre, there was a central air base, four sector air bases, seven satellite airfields and five other airfields. Besides these, there was a high number of other air fields and runways, with almost all isolated military garrisons having their own. The air connections between the theatres and European Portugal were further supported by transit airfields in São Tomé Island, São Tomé and Príncipe and in Sal Island, Cape Verde.

In Angola and Mozambique, Volunteer Air Formations (FAV, Formações Aéreas Voluntárias) units were formed, composed of civilian volunteer pilots who assisted the Air Force in several missions, mostly transport and reconnaissance, using both civilian and military light aircraft.

The Air Force also participated in ground and air-ground operations with its paratrooper forces, which became one of the main shock forces of the Portuguese Armed Forces. These troops, in the beginning of the War were mainly launched by parachute to the operations areas, but later were mainly employed in air assault operations using Alouette III and Puma helicopters. Besides the four regular paratrooper battalions (one in Angola, one in Portuguese Guinea and two in Mozambique), the Air Force was also involved in the creation of the paramilitary elite Paratrooper Special Groups in Mozambique. In order to terminate the guerrilla infiltration in the Angolan northern border, a special composite aviation/paratrooper unit - integrating trackers, paratroopers, helicopters and light aircraft - was created, this becoming the Counter Infiltration Tactical Unit (Unidade Táctica de Contra-Infiltração).

Mainly due to the international arms embargo to Portugal, the Air Force had to struggle with a limitation of means, being obliged to extend the use of old aircraft or to employ aircraft that were not suited for the kind of warfare that was being fought. As an example, in 1972, to cover Angola - a territory with almost the size of all the Western Europe - the FAP had available only 30 helicopters, 44 light aircraft, 13 transport planes, six light bombers and four jet fighters, most of these being old aircraft from the 1940s and 1950s.

A large challenge faced specifically by the Air Force was the increasing antiaircraft capacity of the nationalist forces. This evolved to a dramatic situation in the Guinea theater, when the PAIGC forces received SA-7 Strela surface-to-air missiles and began using them against the Portuguese aircraft. The Portuguese pilots were able to evade the first detected missile launches, but in March 1973, a Fiat G.91 jet is hit and shot down, followed by another G.91 in the same month and then by two Dornier Do 27 and one T-6 in the following month. This originated the loss of FAP's air supremacy, limiting its air activities, namely in the air support to the ground forces and the air casualty evacuation, what caused a negative impact on the morale of the Portuguese forces, especially amongst the constantly flagellated border garrisons. After the initial surprise, the Air Force was however been able to quickly fully resume air operations, adopting mitigating measures, like the changing of the flight profiles or the painting of the aircraft with anti-radiation paint. The adopted counter-measures made that no further aircraft being shot down, despite the continuing use of the SA-7 by the PAIGC in Guinea and the beginning of its use also by the FRELIMO in Mozambique.

The use of surface-to-air missiles by the nationalist forces and the threat of possible air attacks launched from the bordering countries hostile to Portugal, raised the need for the FAP to be equipped with supersonic fighters. The Dassault Mirage III was identified as the only fighter with the needed characteristics that was able to be acquired, as other possible alternatives were denied to Portugal. A secret process of acquisition of Mirage III was then launched but ended however in being suspended due to the termination of the conflict in 1974.

Near the end of the conflict, the FAP was finally able to launch a program to replace some old assets by modern aircraft. Namely, CASA C-212 Aviocar were acquired to replace the Nord Noratlas and C-47 Dakota in the intra-theatre transport role, while Reims Cessna FTB337G Milirole were acquired to replace the T-6 in the armed reconnaissance and to complement the Do 27 in the liaison and forward air control roles. These aircraft however only arrived after the end of the conflict and so ended not to be employed.

=== Late Cold War ===
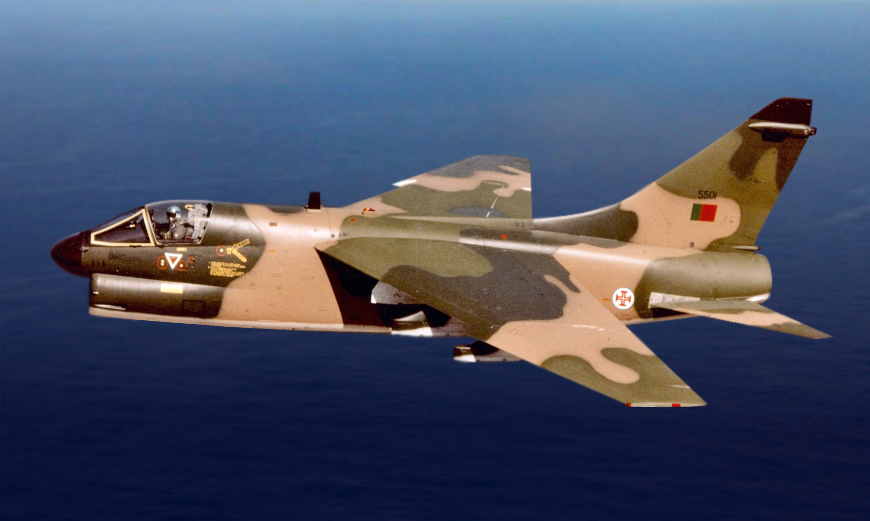
A Portuguese LTV A-7 Corsair II in flight in 1984

Partly due to the Overseas War, on 25 April 1974, middle rank officers of the Portuguese Armed Forces launched a military coup that became known as the "Carnation Revolution" and overthrew the Estado Novo regime. This led to a re-orientation of the Portuguese policy towards the grant of independence to the Overseas territories, with ceasefires being quickly negotiated and agreed with the several nationalist movements. The independence of the several territories followed, occurring between September 1974 (Guinea-Bissau) and November 1975 (Angola). In the middle of the turmoil of the Revolution and the turbulent independence process, the FAP still had to perform some air operations to counter the violation of the Angolan northern border by foreign forces, to support the withdrawal of the Portuguese forces scattered across the several territories and to aid the evacuation of the hundreds of thousands of Portuguese civilians that had fled from those territories. The FAP gradually withdrew from the several Overseas territories, delivering its bases and part of its aircraft to the authorities of the new countries. A reverse process occurred however in Portuguese Timor, to where FAP had to send a detachment of Alouette III helicopters and another of paratroopers to aid the local authorities in the independence process of what would become East Timor and which was degenerating in a civil conflict. These two detachments ended up becoming the only relevant forces with which the Portuguese Governor could count. When Indonesia launched the invasion of East Timor on 7 December 1975, the FAP detachments were with the Governor in Atauro Island, withdrawing with him to aboard two Portuguese warships, with the helicopters being destroyed and abandoned on the island.

By 1976, the around 850 aircraft inventory that the Air Force had in 1974, was reduced to a third, with most of the old assets being phased out and part of the new ones (especially Alouette III helicopters) being sold. The 2nd and 3rd air regions and the Cape Verde and Guinea Air Zone had been disbanded, as well as their air bases and other units.

The FAP had to re-orient itself from the focus in the counter-insurgency operations in Africa to a focus in the defence of Western Europe against a possible threat from Warsaw Pact forces, in the scope of the Cold War. In the scope of this, a major reorganisation of the Air Force started in 1977. This included the creation of the national air command, headed by the Chief of Staff of the Air Force and, under it, the creation of the Operational Command of the Air Force (COFA), by the transformation of the 1st Air Region Command. In the process, the Air Force Academy was also created, assuming gradually the responsibility for the training of the FAP officers, until then trained in the Military Academy. The reorganization also focused on the flying units, with the creation, disbandment and dislocation of several squadrons. The changes also felt in some details, like the changing of the aircraft paint schemes (with most of them adopting the Southern NATO camouflage scheme) and the changing of the flying units designation system. The squadrons ceasing so to be designated by a number that reflected the number of their base and started to be designated by a number that reflect their primary mission and type of aircraft flown.

The reorganisation of the FAP was accompanied by its re-equipment. This included the reception of C-212 Aviocar and C-130 Hercules aircraft that replaced the remaining Nord Noratlas, C-47, DC-6 and Boeing 707 and the reception of Reims Cessna FTB337G that replaced the remaining Do 27 and T-6. Besides the transport versions, some of the C-212 Aviocar were specially fitted for the execution of electronic warfare and geophysical survey missions. Later, C-212 of the maritime patrol version would also be acquired. Due to the obsolescence and eminent phasing out of the F-86 Sabre and the P-2 Neptune, plans were also done to acquire Northrop F-5 fighters and Lockheed P-3 Orion maritime patrol aircraft. As part of the fighter acquisition program, the FAP received 12 Northrop T-38 Talon jet trainers - its first supersonic aircraft - to prepare its pilots to operate the foreseen F-5 fighters. However, instead of the F-5, the FAP ended to receive Vought A-7P Corsair II to be primarily used in the air interdiction and in the tactical air support maritime operations missions, in order to respond to the compromises assumed with NATO. The lack of fighters, meant that the A-7P were also used in the air defense missions, despite lacking the adequate characteristics for that role. Portugal remained so without an effective national air defence, from the retirement of the last F-86 in 1980 to the introduction of the F-16 in 1994, with FAP not being able to respond to many violations of the Portuguese air space during that period. Besides the A-7P, the FAP continued to operate the Fiat G.91 in the close air support and battlefield air interdiction roles, with one of the squadrons equipped with this aircraft being based at Lajes, to guarantee also the air defense of the Azores islands. The acquisition of the maritime patrol aircraft also delayed, with FAP receiving the P-3P Orion only in 1988. From the phasing out of the P-2 Neptune in 1977 to the acquisition of the P-3 Orion, the air patrolling of the enormous Portuguese maritime area was carried away mainly by using C-130 and C-212 Aviocar, including aircraft equipped with MAD.

The process of the modernisation of the Air Force also included the launching of the SICCAP/PoACCS (Portugal Air Command and Control System) project, which was a pioneer in adopting the new architecture and concept of the NATO ACCS, being intended to replace the old SDA air defense system. As part of these project, the air surveillance and detection units were re-equipped, including the reception of new radars and the air control centre at Monsanto was enhanced.

In the 1980s, the FAP collaborated in the firefighting of the increasing number of wildfires that affected the large forest areas of Portugal. For this, FAP acquired the MAFFS aerial firefighting system to be installed in its C-130 aircraft. Despite the MAFFS equipped C-130 being a fundamental and cheap tool of the Portuguese forest firefighting system, its intervention stopped to be required by the civil protection authorities, with the role being transferred to private aerial firefighting companies.

=== Recent ===
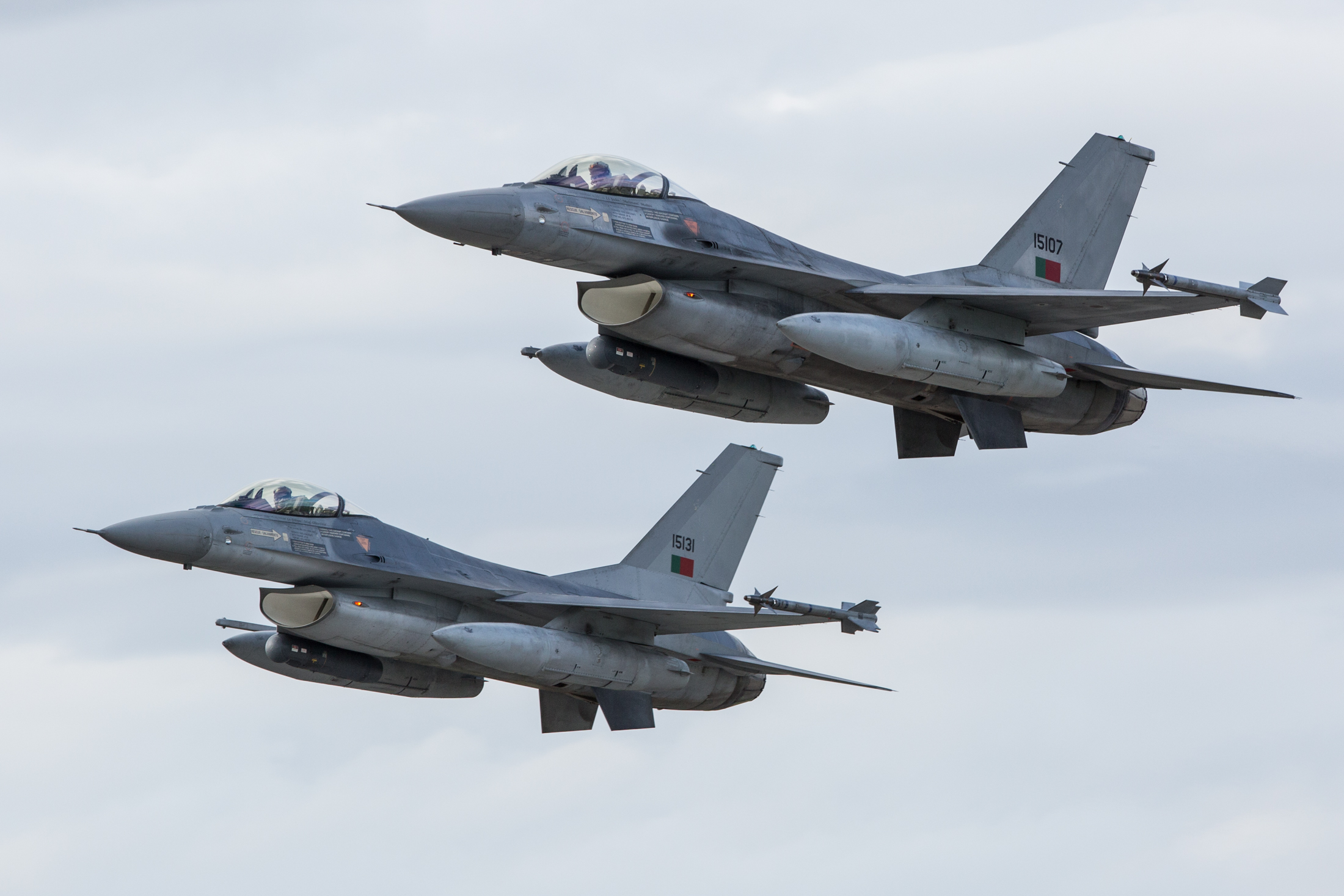
FAP's F-16A fighters

The end of the Cold War caused the FAP to accompany the shift of the focus of the Portuguese Armed Forces from a conventional war in Europe against the Warsaw Pact forces to the international peace enforcement missions. The FAP started to participate in a number of missions by itself or in support of missions led by the Army and the Navy. Most of these missions have been carried away under the scope of the United Nations, NATO, the European Union and the former-Western European Union. Recent FAP international operations include the NATO Assurance Measures Romania, the Baltic Air Policing, the Icelandic Air Policing, the Operation Active Endeavour, the Operation Atalanta and the Operation Sea Guardian.

Besides the multilateral missions, FAP also participated in national unilateral military operations abroad, including those carried out in Angola (1992) and in Guinea-Bissau (1998).

With the end of the Cold War, the FAP saw new changes, aiming at the rationalising its forces. This included the deactivation of some air bases - including Tancos (transferred to the Army), São Jacinto (becoming a civilian airfield) and Ota (becoming the Military and Technical Training Center of the Air Force) -, the transfer of the Paratroopers to the Army and the privatization of the OGMA aircraft workshops. The 1990s also saw the FAP ceasing to have the exclusivity of the military air activities in Portugal, with the activation of the Navy's Helicopter Squadron and the creation of the Army Light Aviation Group (that ended by never becoming operational).

In 1993, the Air Force received 50 Dassault/Dornier Alpha Jet, which replaced the remaining Fiat G.91s in the close air support role and the Cessna T-37 in the advanced training role. In 1994, FAP finally received the first General Dynamics F-16 fighters, with them regaining an effective air defense capacity. A second batch of F-16 would be received in 1998. The F-16 gradually replaced the A-7P Corsair II, initially in the air defense role (transitorily assumed by these in the 1980s) and later also in the ground attack role, with the last Portuguese Corsair II aircraft being retired in 1999.

Already in 2005, the FAP received AgustaWestland EH-101 helicopters to replace its Aerospatiale Puma. The EH-101 are mainly used in the search and rescue role, being based at the Montijo Air Base, with some permanently deployed at Lajes Air Base, Azores and Porto Santo Military Airfield, Madeira. However, due to maintenance issues with the EH-101, some of the Puma helicopters had to be reactivated in the 2008-2011 period, to assure the SAR missions from the Azores.

This was followed by the introduction of the EADS CASA C-295, which replaced the C-212 Aviocar. Also former-Netherlands Naval Aviation Service P-3C CUP Orion maritime patrol aircraft replaced the P-3P Orion fleet. The F-16 fleet has completed the Mid Life Update conversion and update, with the fighters now in service with two squadrons at Monte Real Air Base.

Besides its usual role of air policing of the country, a recent new type of important missions for the FAP have been the air security of high visibility events happening in Portugal, aiming to protect them especially against terrorist attacks using renegade aircraft. Major air security operations have been carried out for such events as the UEFA Euro 2004, the 2010 Lisbon NATO summit, the 2010 Pope Benedict XVI visit to Portugal and the World Youth Day 2023. For these missions, FAP employed the SICCAP air control and command system, which coordinated the action of F-16 fighters responsible to intercept fast flying aircraft and of armed helicopters intended to intercept slow flying aircraft. Depending on the mission, FAP was supported and coordinated the action of NATO AWACS aircraft, by Portuguese Navy anti-aircraft frigates and by Portuguese Army anti-aircraft units.

The Alpha Jets were phased out, with the last flight occurring in January 2018, without being replaced by another aircraft. Without any advanced jet trainers in service, the Portuguese fighter pilots started to be trained in foreign countries, as a stop-gap measure. Meanwhile, the FAP is looking for possible alternatives within its budget constraints, including the renting of jet trainers or the establishment of an international fighter pilot training school with its costs shared by participant air forces of several countries.

In the early 2019, the FAP received its first AW 119 Koala helicopters, acquired to replace the Alouette III in the training, SAR and wildfire fighting. In 2023, Sikorsky UH-60 Black Hawk helicopters were also acquired for the SAR and wildfire fighting roles. There are also plans to acquire armed helicopters to be used in the support of the Army and counter-insurgency aircraft to be used in the support of the Portuguese forces engaged in international peace enforcement operations. In 2023, the FAP received the first of its Embraer KC-390 jet-powered transport aircraft, which will gradually replace the C-130 aircraft.

On 12 April 2024, FAP Chief of Staff General Cartaxo Alves announced plans to replace the F-16 with 28 Lockheed Martin F-35A aircraft by 2030, aligning with European allies' strategic efforts. However, the Ministry of National Defence clarified that there are no current plans to acquire the fifth-generation aircraft, as the Military Programming Law (LPM) approved in March 2023 prioritized other defense acquisitions. Despite this, Alves' statements indicated that Portugal was preparing to transition to the F-35 in the future. In March 2025, this changed: the Portuguese Defense Minister deemed a potential F-35 procurement unlikely because of recent changes in US foreign policy. Eleven months later, the US ambassador to Portugal nevertheless pushed Portugal to order F-35s.

In June 2024, the Portuguese Defense Minister Nuno Melo announced the prioritization of acquiring the A-29N Super Tucano, an advanced light attack and training aircraft from Embraer. Melo confirmed that the aircraft would be adapted by the Portuguese industry to operate within NATO standards, with €180.5 million allocated for this acquisition and several units ready for swift delivery upon contract finalization additionally Minister Nuno announced July 30 2025 Portugal would join the 6th gen European fighter program.

== General organization ==
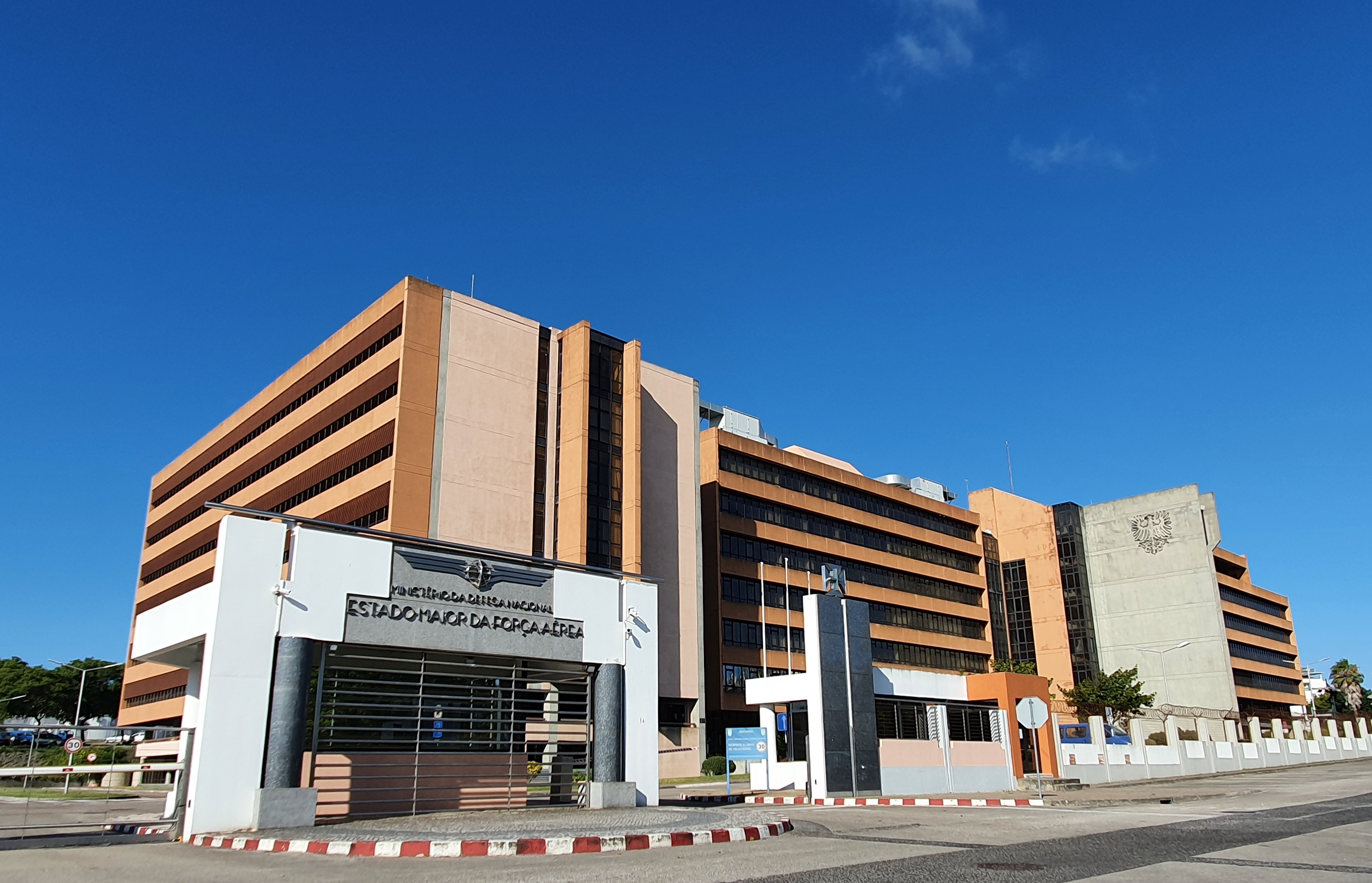
Alfragide complex, headquarters of the Portuguese Air Force

The general organization presently in force for the Portuguese Air Force was established in December 2014. Accordingly, with this organization, the FAP is commanded by the Chief of Staff of the Air Force and includes:

- the Air Force Staff;
- the central bodies of administration and management;
- the air component command;
- the bodies of advisement;
- the Inspection General of the Air Force;
- the base bodies;
- the elements of the operational component of the system of forces;
- the bodies and services regulated by particular legislation.

In terms of planning, the FAP is structured in three levels of responsibility:

- Long term planning — it is of the responsibility of the Chief of Staff of the Air Force seconded by the Vice-Chief of Staff, who runs the Staff of the Air Force.
- Short term planning — it is of the responsibility of the three major commands of the FAP, that change the doctrinal directives into operational and technical directives: Air Command, Air Force Personnel Command and Air Force Logistics Command.
- Execution — The base units, depending hierarchically and functionally from the respective functional and technical Command, are responsible for the execution. They are formed into three Groups: Operational Group, Maintenance Group and Support Group, organized according to the mission and means assigned. These units are responsible for applying the directives, having the air operations as outcome.

=== Chief of Staff of the Air Force ===
The Chief of Staff of the Air Force (Chefe do Estado-Maior da Força Aérea, CEMFA) is the commander of the Portuguese Air Force. It is the only full General (four-star rank) of the Air Force. The CEMFA is the principal adviser of the minister of National Defense and of the Chief of the General Staff of the Armed Forces in all Air Force specific matters, having the competence foreseen in the Law and participates, inherently, in the bodies of advisement in it foreseen.

By inheritance, the CEMFA is also the National Aeronautical Authority and in this quality is directly dependent from the ministry of National Defence.

The CEMFA is directly supported by the Office of the CEMA - headed by a major-general - and by the Air Force Legal Department.

The CEMFA is assisted by the Vice-Chief of Staff of the Air Force (VCEMFA), who is the Air Force second-in-command. The VCEMFA is a lieutenant-general superordinate to all the other Air Force officers of the same rank. Under the direct dependency of the VCEMFA are the Lisbon Support Unit, the Air Force Documentation Service and the Sub-Registry.

=== Air Force Staff ===
The Air Force Staff (Estado-Maior da Força Aérea, EMFA) is the body responsible for studying, conceiving and planning the Air Force activities, supporting the Chief of Staff of the Air Force decisions. The EMFA is headed by the Vice Chief of Staff of the Air Force assisted by the Deputy Chief of Staff of the Air Force (Subchefe do Estado-Maior da Força Aérea, SUBCEMFA), who is a major-general pilot-aviator.

The EMFA includes the divisions (1st - Personnel, 2nd - Intelligence, 3rd - Operations and 4th - Logistics) and the support bodies.

It is installed in the Air Force's Alfragide complex, in the suburban area of Lisbon.

=== Central bodies of administration and management ===
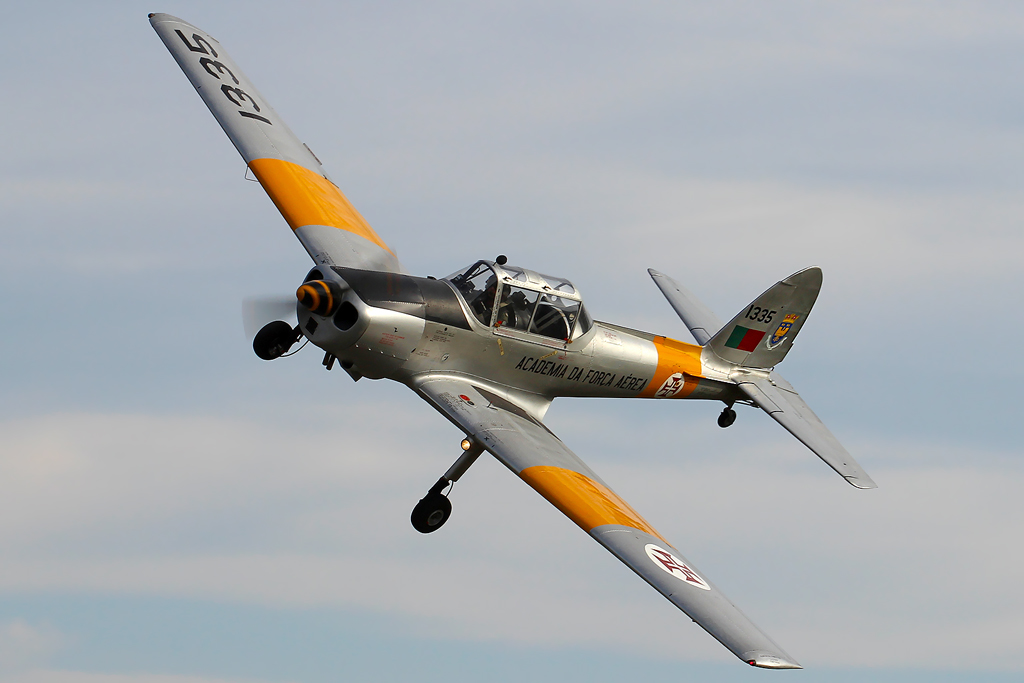
OGMA Chipmunk primary trainer of the Portuguese Air Force Academy

The central bodies of administration and management have a functional character and are intended to assure the management and the execution of essential specific activities, namely in the management of human, material, financial, intelligence and infrastructure resources. They are headed by general officers, directly subordinated to the CEMFA. These have functional and technical authority over all the units and bodies of the Air Force, regarding their scopes of responsibility. All of these bodies are installed in the Air Force's Alfragide complex. The bodies are:

- Air Force Personnel Command (CPESFA) - it has the mission of guaranteeing the administration of the human resources of the Air Force. It is commanded by a lieutenant-general. It includes the Justice and Discipline Service, the Social Welfare Service and the Religious Support Center. Besides these, it has under its command the directorates of Personnel, of Training and of Health, the Military and Technical Training Center of the Air Force and the Recruitment Center.
- Air Force Logistics Command (CLAFA) - it has the mission of administering the material, communications, information systems and infrastructure resources of the Air Force and to guarantee the fulfilment of the requirements for the certification of the navigability of the military aircraft. It is commanded by a lieutenant-general. It has under its command the directorates of Supplying and Transports, of Communications and Information Systems, of Engineering and Programs, of Infra-Structure and of Weapons Systems Maintenance, as well as the General Storage Complex of the Air Force (Depósito Geral de Material da Força Aérea, DGMFA);
- Air Force Directorate of Finance - it has the mission of administering the financial resources made available to the Air Force. It is headed by the director of Finance, who is a major-general. It has under its command the Administrative and Financial Service.

=== Air component command ===
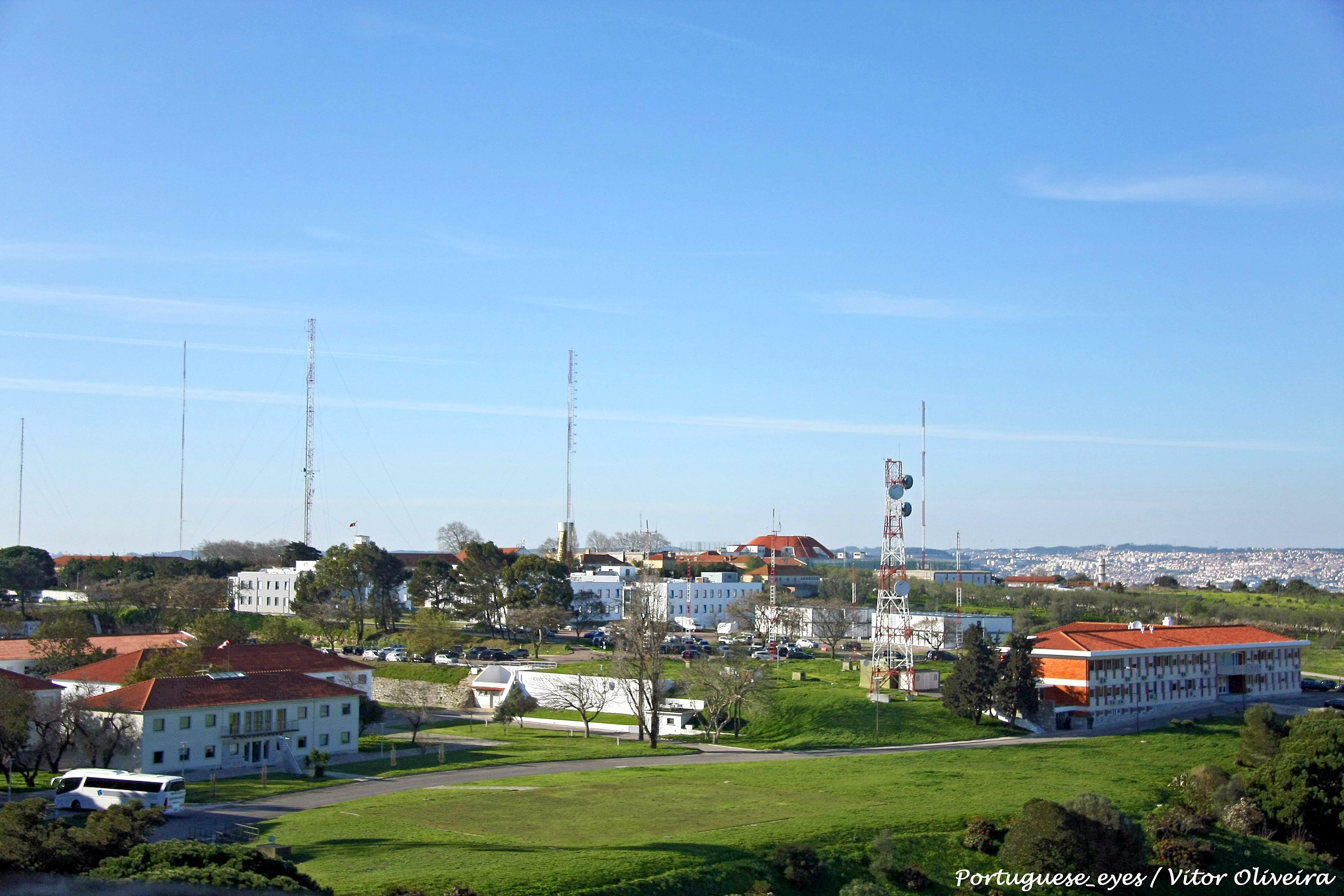
Air Command facilities at the Air Force Monsanto complex

The Air Command (Comando Aéreo, CA) is - at the same time - the air component command of the Armed Forces of Portugal and the operational command of the Portuguese Air Force. It is commanded by a lieutenant-general directly reporting to the CEMFA, with a major-general pilot-aviator as the second-in-command. It is installed at the Monsanto hills Air Force complex in Lisbon, with its air operations centre being located in an underground bunker.

The CA has the mission of supporting the exercise of command from the part of the CEMFA, in view of the preparation, the readying and the sustenance of the forces and means of the operational component of the system of forces, of the accomplishment of the missions regulated by particular legislation and other missions given to the Air Force, keeping the Chief of the General Staff of the Armed Forces permanently informed of the employed forces and means and of the development and results of their respective operations, of the planning, command and control the air activity, of the administration and management of the units and bodies of the fixed component placed under its direct dependence and of the planning, guidance and control of the military security of the units and bodies of the Air Force.

Besides the second-in-command, the CA includes also the air operations bodies, the operations support bodies, the Coordinating Office of the Air Force Military Security and the Support Group. The air operations bodies are headed by the Director of Air Operations, who is a brigadier-general. Under the command of the CA are the air zone commands, the air bases, the maneuver airfields, the transit airfields, the Firing Range, the radar stations and the training centres.

The air zone commands have the mission of planning, supervising and controlling the readiness of the air power resources and the air activity in their areas of responsibility. They are also responsible for guaranteeing, under the terms established in international agreements, the relationships with the foreign forces stationed at the bases under their hierarchic authority. Presently, only the Azores Air Zone Command is active, having the Lajes Air Base under its command. The Madeira Air Zone Command is also foreseen in the Air Force organization, but it is not yet active, with the units located in the Madeira isles (Porto Santo Airfield and Pico do Arieiro Radar Station) staying under the direct command of the CA.

=== Bodies of advisement ===
The bodies of advisement are intended to support the decisions of the CEMFA in special and important matters regarding the preparation, discipline and administration of the Army. These bodies are:

- Higher Council of the Air Force (CSFA) - it is the higher body of advisement of the CEMFA. Under the presidency of the CEMFA, it includes all the lieutenant-generals of the Air Force;
- Higher Council of Discipline of the Air Force (CSDFA) - it is the body of advisement and support of the CEMFA in disciplinary matters;
- Historical-Cultural Commission of the Air Force (CHCFA) - it is the body of advisement and support of the CEMFA in historical-cultural matters;
- Higher Board of Health of the Air Force (JSSFA) - it has the mission of analysing and advise about the appeals regarding decisions taken by the competent entities, based in the opinions issued by other medical boards of the Air Force.

=== Inspection-General of the Air Force ===
The Inspection-General of the Air Force (Inspeção-Geral da Força Aérea, IGFA) is the inspection body of the Air Force. Its mission is to support the CEME in the exercise of the role of control and evaluation and in the prevention and investigation of accidents. It is headed by the Inspector-General of the Air Force, who is a general officer in the reserve.

The IGFA includes Office of Accident Prevention, the departments of Inspection and of Audit and the Secretariat.

=== Base bodies ===
The mission of the base bodies have is the training, the sustentance and the general support of the Air Force. The mission of the base units is to guarantee the air activity and the logistical and administrative support to the units and bodies located on them. The base bodies include the Air Force Academy, the units and bodies under the hierarchical dependency of the VCEMA, CPESFA, CLAFA, CA and air zone commands and the cultural bodies.

The Air Force Academy is a public university establishment responsible for the training of the officers of the Air Force. The base units are the Air Force airfields where its air assets are stationed. They include main air bases - which have their own air units - and forward air bases (including transit and maneuver airfields) - which only have stationed air assets deployed from the main air bases. The cultural bodies are intended to guarantee the cultural activities of the Air Force, including the collection, study, consultation and exhibit of the aeronautical historical-cultural heritage. They include the Air Museum, the Air Force Historical Archive, the Air Force Music Band and the "Mais Alto" magazine.

==== Air bases ====
The air bases are the FAP's units that are responsible for guaranteeing the readiness of the flying units and the logistic and administrative support of the units and bodies located on their facilities but dependent from other commands. They always include an airfield and are responsible for their own defense. Besides the air bases, FAP has other secondary base units, that are called transit or maneuver airfields.

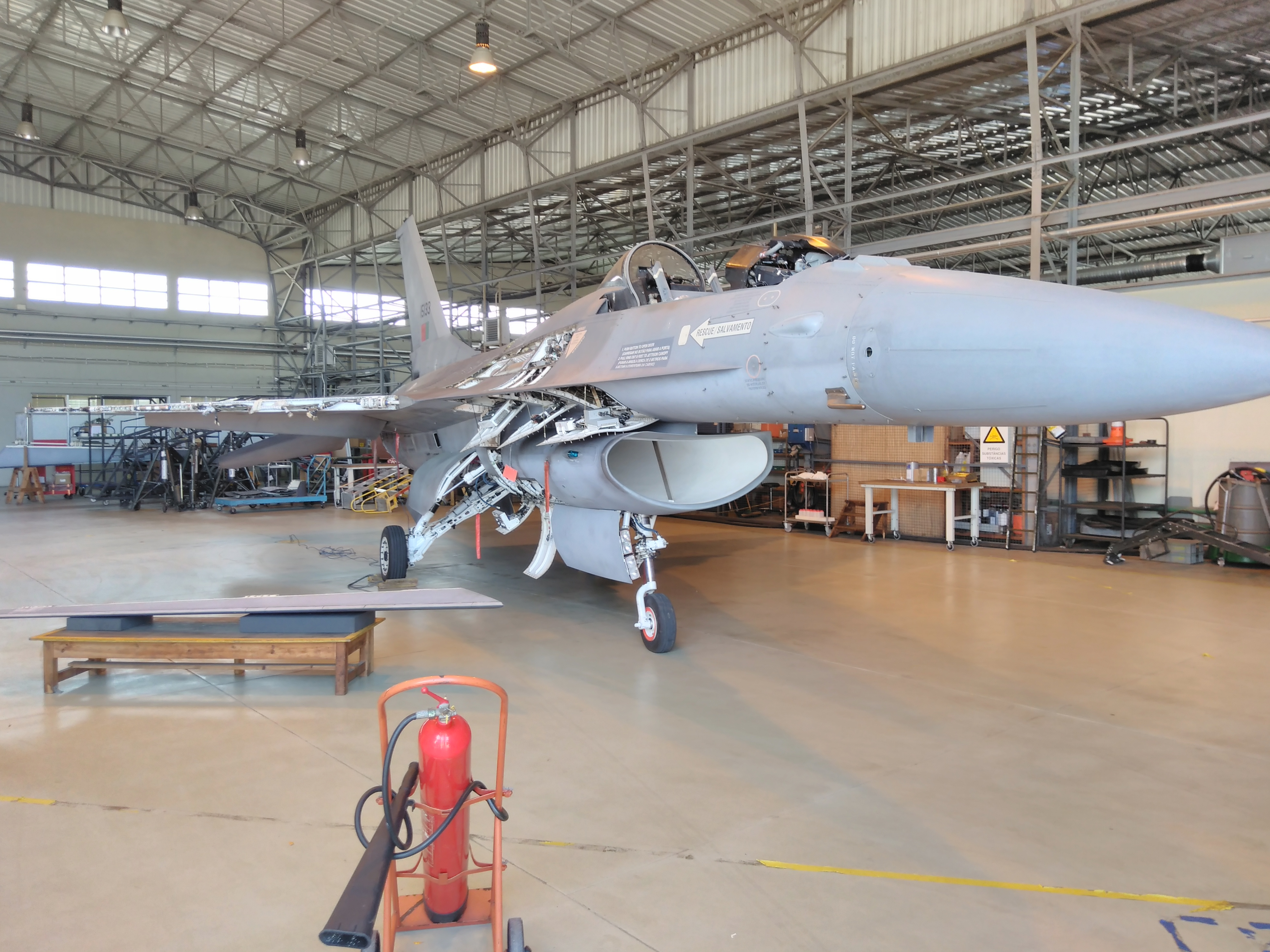
F-16A under maintenance at Monte Real Air Base (BA5)

Each air base includes operational and support groups. The operational group is the sub-unit responsible for the flying activities of the base, being designated by a two or three digit number, of which the first one or two digits correspond to the number of the air base. As its sub-units, it includes the flying squadrons or other flying units based at the air base. The support group is the sub-unit responsible for the support activities of the air base, including logistics, security and personnel affairs.

The standard organization of each air base usually includes:

1. Commanding officer (colonel pilot-aviator);
2. Second-in-command (lieutenant-colonel pilot-aviator);
3. Commanding officer support bodies:
  - Combat Operations Center, including the Air Operations, Security and Defence Coordinating, Communications and Meteorology centers;
  - Direct support bodies: Command Office, Justice Section, General Secretariat, Social Action Office and Chaplain;
  - Planning and control bodies: Planning, Accident Prevention, Military Security and Quality and Environment offices;
4. Execution sub-units:
  - Operational Group, including: Group Commander (lieutenant-colonel pilot-aviator), Operations Officer, Secretariat, Air Traffic Squadron, Materiel Squadron, training flying units and operational flying units;
  - Support Group, including Group Commander (lieutenant-colonel), Technical Office, Procurement Office, Secretariat, Computer Center, Health Center, Supply Squadron, Administration and Commissariat Squadron, Personnel Squadron, Base Maintenance Squadron, Ground Electrical Materiel Maintenance Squadron and Air Police Squadron.

=== Elements of the operational component of the system of forces ===
The elements of the operational component of the system of forces are the forces and means of the Air Force intended to fulfil operational missions. These elements are:

1. the operational planning bodies - these are the bodies responsible for the elaboration of plans and orders of operations, aimed at the operational employment of the forces and assets;
2. the Air Command and Control System - responsible for the command and control of the forces and assets of the air component;
3. the operational air units - these units are integrated sets of personnel, aircraft, materiel and equipment, organised under a commanding officer, for the execution of operational missions, tasks and actions;
4. the antiaircraft intervention units - units of these type are foreseen but none has been created. They would have the mission of guaranteeing the antiaircraft defence of the units, bodies, and deployed forces and assets of the Air Force, as well as of other sensitive areas and points.

==== Squadrons ====
The squadron (esquadra) is the basic flying unit of the Portuguese Air Force. Each flying squadron usually has a single type of aircraft and is stationed and under the administrative command of a specific air base, although it can have part of its aircraft deployed in other bases.

In theory, each squadron would have 25, 12 or 6 aircraft, depending if it was, respectively, a unit of light, medium or heavy aircraft. In practice, the number of aircraft of each squadron depends on the available materiel. Due to the trend for the reduction of the size of the FAP, presently each model of aircraft is concentrated in a single squadron, the exception being the F-16 that are divided by two squadrons (one with air defense and the other with attack missions).

Until 1977, the flying squadrons were designated by a two or three digit number of which the first digits corresponding to the number of its base and the last digit being the order of the squadron in that base. With this system, whenever a squadron changed base, its number also changed. In 1977, the flying squadrons started to be designated by a number that identifies its primary mission and type of aircraft flown and its unrelated with its base, so being kept even if the squadron changes base. In the squadron number, the first digit identifies its primary mission, the second identifies the type of aircraft operated and the third identifies the sequential order of the squadron among the units with the same primary mission and aircraft operated.

So, the first digit can be: 1 - Training; 2 - Fighter; 3 - Attack; 4 - Reconnaissance; 5 - Transport; 6 - Maritime patrol; 7 - Search and rescue; 8 - Special function; 9 - Intelligence, surveillance and reconnaissance.

The second digit can be: 0 - Fixed-wing aircraft; 1 - Mixed; 5 - Rotary-wing aircraft; 9 - Unmanned air vehicles.

Squadrons can be subdivided in flying flights (esquadrilhas), which are the smallest flying units of the Air Force. In the past, independent flying flights have existed, but now they only exist as sub-units of flying squadrons. Presently, the squadrons are not usually subdivided in flying flights, although they include non-flying flights (operations and maintenance).

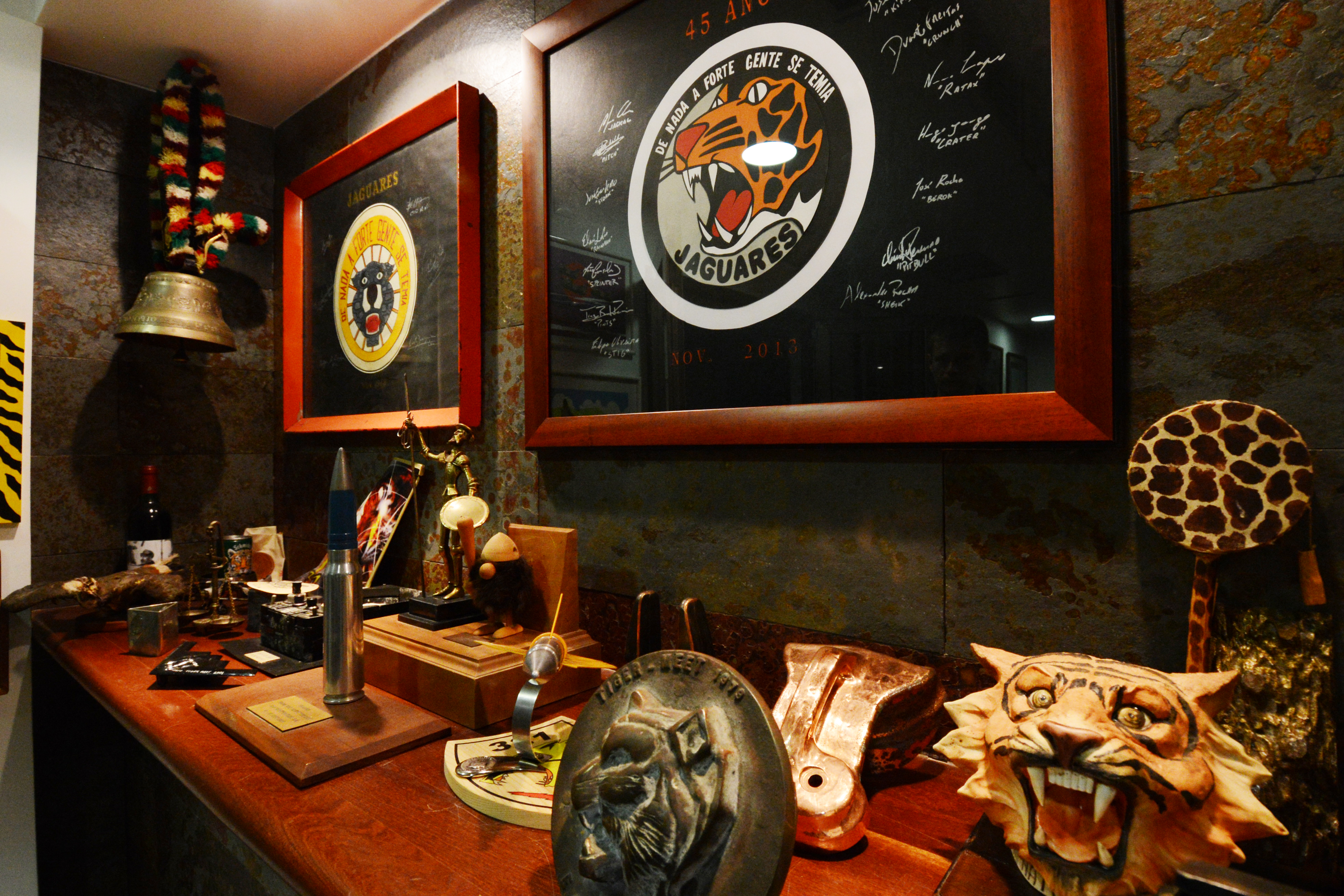
Heritage room of the 301 Squadron "Jaguares", with its trophies, insignia and other memorabilia

The standard organisation of each squadron includes:

1. Squadron commander (major pilot aviator);
2. Secretariat;
3. Standardisation and Evaluation Section;
4. Accident Prevention Section;
5. Mobility and Support Section;
6. Operations Flight:
  - Fire Section,
  - Operational Planning Section,
  - Mission Support Section;
7. Maintenance Flight:
  - Control and Planning Section,
  - Preparedness Section;
8. Aircraft and crews.

Flying squadrons are grouped in operational groups (grupos operationais), which also include non-flying air traffic and materiel squadrons. Presently, each main air base has an operational group which is usually identified by a two or three digit number, of which the first one or two correspond to the number of the air base and the last one is the order of the group inside the base.

It is to note that the Air Force uses the flying unit terminology also in its non-flying units. So, non flying groups, squadrons and flights also exist.

=== Bodies and services regulated by particular legislation ===
==== Air Search and Rescue Service ====
The Air Force includes the Air Search and Rescue Service (Serviço de Busca e Salvamento Aéreo, SBSA), which is regulated by particular legislation. The SBSA is headed by the CEMFA and is responsible for the search and rescue actions, related with aircraft accidents, occurred in the Lisbon and Santa Maria search and rescue regions.

==== National Aeronautical Authority ====
The National Aeronautical Authority (Autoridade Aeronáutica Nacional, AAN) is the public body responsible to exercise the authority powers of the Portuguese State in the permanent strategic air space of national interest, accordingly with the guidelines defined by the minister of National Defense. Namely it is responsible for the Air Policing Service (Serviço de Policiamento Aéreo, SPA), air navigability of military aircraft, prepare the diplomatic requests of overflight and landing and authorize the air surveys. Despite being statutorily independent from the Air Force, the AAN is headed by the Chief of Staff of the Air Force - who in that role personalizes and assumes the title of AAN - with its structure and functioning being assured by the Air Force.

== System of forces of the Air Force ==
As a whole, the Air Force is part of the system of forces of the Portuguese Armed Forces. The system of forces of the Air Force itself includes a fix component and an operational component.

=== Fix component ===
Location of the main Air Force units in Continental Portugal. Not included are units in the Azores and Madeira (off-map to west).
Legend: BA - Air base; AT/AM - Other airfield; ER - Radar station; CFMTFA - Air Force Military and Technical Training Center; DGM - General Storage Complex of the Air Force

The fix component of the system of forces includes the set of commands, units, establishments, bodies and services that are essential for the organization and general support of the Air Force. These are all non-deployable elements and include air bases and other airfields, radar stations, training establishments and a number of other types of bodies.

Divided by type, the fix component includes the following list of units, bases and bodies:

1. Base units:
  - BA1 - Air Base No. 1, Sintra (LPST)
  - BA4 - Air Base No. 4, Lajes, Azores (LPLA)
  - BA5- Air Base No. 5, Monte Real (LPMR)
  - BA6 - Air Base No. 6, Montijo (LPMT)
  - BA8 - Air Base No. 8 (former AM1 - Maneuvers Airfield No. 1), Ovar (LPOV)
  - BA11 - Air Base No. 11, Beja (LPBJ)
  - AT1 - Transit Airfield No. 1, Lisbon (LPPT)
  - AM3 - Maneuvers Airfield No. 3, Porto Santo, Madeira (LPPS)
2. Surveillance and detection units:
  - ER1 - Radar Station No. 1, Fóia
  - ER2 - Radar Station No. 2, Paços de Ferreira
  - ER3 - Radar Station No. 3, Montejunto
  - ER4 - Radar Station No. 4, Pico do Arieiro, Madeira
3. Training units:
  - AFA - Air Force Academy, co-located with BA1 at Sintra
  - CFMTFA - Military and Technical Training Center of the Air Force, Ota (LPOT)
  - CTSFA - Surviving Training Center of the Air Force, co-located with BA6 at Montijo
  - CTCFA - Canine Training Center of the Air Force, co-located with CFMTFA at Ota
  - NOTP - Tactical Operations of Projection Core, co-located with CT at Alcochete
4. Support units:
  - DGMFA - General Storage Complex of the Air Force, Alverca (LPAR)
  - CT - Firing Range, Alcochete
  - CRFA - Air Force Recruiting Center, Lisbon
  - UAL - Lisbon Support Unit, Alfragide
5. Cultural bodies
  - MUSAR - Air Museum, co-located with BA1 at Sintra (with branches co-located with DGMFA at Alverca and BA8 at Ovar)
  - AHFA - Air Force Historical Archive, co-located with UAL at Alfragide
  - BMFA - Air Force Music Band, Lisbon
  - "Mais Alto" magazine, co-located with UAL at Alfragide

=== Operational component ===
The operational component of the system of forces includes the operational commands, forces, means and units of the Air Force.

1. Elements of the Air Command and Control System:
  - CRC "Batina" - Control and Reporting Centre, Monsanto, Lisbon
  - CRC ALT "Zanaga" - Alternative Control and Reporting Centre, co-located with BA11, Beja
  - ER1 - Radar Station No. 1, Fóia
  - ER2 - Radar Station No. 2, Paços de Ferreira
  - ER3 - Radar Station No. 3, Montejunto
  - ER4 - Radar Station No. 4, Pico do Arieiro, Madeira
2. Flying units:
  - 101 Squadron "Roncos" with Epsilon TB-30, recently moved to BA11, Beja, previously based at BA1, Sintra;
  - 201 Squadron "Falcões" with F-16M, based at BA5, Monte Real;
  - 301 Squadron "Jaguares" with F-16M, based at BA5, Monte Real;
  - 501 Squadron "Bisontes" with C-130, based at BA6, Montijo;
  - 502 Squadron "Elefantes" with C-295, based at BA6, Montijo, with permanent detachments at BA4, Lajes and AM3, Porto Santo;
  - 504 Squadron "Linces" with Falcon 50 and Falcon 900, based at BA6, Montijo, but permanently deployed at AT1, Lisbon;
  - 506 Squadron "Rinocerontes" with KC-390 based at BA11, Beja;
  - 551 Squadrom "Panteras" with Sikorsky UH-60 Black Hawk based at BA8, Ovar; the squadron was re-activated on November 24, 2023.
  - 552 Squadron "Zangões" with AW119 Koala based at BA11, Beja, with a permanent detachment at BA8, Ovar;
  - 601 Squadron "Lobos" with P-3C, based at BA11, Beja;
  - 751 Squadron "Pumas" with EH-101, based at BA6, Montijo, with permanent detachment at AM3, Porto Santo;
  - 752 Squadron "Fénix" with EH-101, based at BA4, Lajes;
  - 802 Squadron "Águias" with Chipmunk, L-23 and ASK 21, based at BA1, Sintra;
  - 991 Squadron "Harpias" with UAVision OGS-42N/VN, based at CFMTFA, Ota.

== Aircraft ==
New equipment
Phased out

Aircraft	Image	Origin	Type	Variant	In service	Notes
Combat aircraft
F-16 Fighting Falcon		United States	Multirole fighter	F-16AM	24 (Note: Four trainer aircraft are listed lower in the table.)	All upgraded to MLU standard, block 52 comparable.
Maritime patrol
Airbus C295		Spain	Maritime patrol / SAR	Persuader	5	
Lockheed P-3 Orion		United States	ASW / Maritime patrol	P-3C CUP+ Block II	11	5 purchased in 2005 from the Royal Netherlands Navy and modernised twice to Cup+ Block II standard. 6 purchased in 2023 from the German Navy Marineflieger with the spares and the MLU sets of which 5 will be modernized to Cup+ Block II standard in Canada.
Transport
Embraer C-390		Brazil / Portugal	Tactical airlifter / Tanker	KC-390	4/6	2 on order. Partially assembled by OGMA.
C-130 Hercules		United States	Tactical airlifter	C-130H/H-30	4	Modernized by OGMA with new avionics and a glass cockpit between 2019 and 2026.
Airbus C295		Spain	Tactical airlifter	M	7	A unit received in 2026, after repairs at Airbus facilities in Seville, following a landing in Porto Santo Airport without its landing gear in 2021.
Dassault Falcon 50		France	MEDEVAC / Transport		3	Modernized by Aeromec in 2020 with a glass cockpit.
Dassault Falcon 900		France	VIP / MEDEVAC	900B	1	Received an overhaul during 2 years at Dassault workshops in Switzerland.
Aerial firefighting
C-130 Hercules		United States	Tactical airlifter	C-130H/H-30	0/2	2 will be converted for aerial firefighting with Modular Airborne FireFighting System kits during 2026.
Canadair DHC-515		Canada	Water bomber		0/2	2 on order (July 2024)
Helicopters
AgustaWestland AW101		United Kingdom / Italy	SAR / Transport		12	12 units received since 2004 in 3 versions; 6 received as search and rescue variant.; 4 combat search and rescue variant.; 2 fisheries protection variant (later converted to search and rescue variant).
AgustaWestland AW119		Italy	SAR / Trainer / Transport	AW119Kx	7	7 units received since 2019; 5 ordered in 2018; 2 ordered in 2022
Sikorsky UH-60		United States	Fire suppressor / Transport	UH-60A/L	7/13	A total of 13 Sikorsky UH-60 helicopters ordered since 2023; 6 UH-60A purchased from Arista Aviation in 2023.; 3 UH-60L purchased from Ace Aeronautics in 2024.; 4 UH-60L purchased from Ace Aeronautics in 2026.
Trainer aircraft
F-16 Fighting Falcon		United States	Conversion trainer	F-16BM	4 (Note: 24 combat aircraft are listed above in the table.)	
Embraer A-29 Super Tucano		Brazil / Portugal	Advanced trainer / Multirole attack turboprop	A-29N	5/12	7 on order (December 2024). Partially assembled by OGMA.
Socata TB 30		France / Portugal	Basic trainer		11	Assembled at OGMA. To be replaced by Embraer EMB 314 Super Tucano, starting beginning of 2027.
Tecnam P-Mentor		Italy	Basic trainer		0/7	7 on order (to replace DHC-1 Chipmunk)
DHC-1 Chipmunk		Canada	Basic trainer	Mk 20	7	License built in Portugal by OGMA. To be replaced by Tecnam P-Mentor, starting beginning of 2027.
UAV
UAVision OGASSA		Portugal	Reconnaissance / Surveillance	OGS42/V	12	4 with VTOL capability
Tekever ARX		Portugal	Reconnaissance / Surveillance		0/8	A total of 8 Tekever ARX Unmanned surveillance and reconnaissance aerial vehicles ordered in 2025.
Tekever AR5		Portugal	Reconnaissance / Surveillance		Unknown	
Satellites
ICEYE X73		Finland	High resolution synthetic-aperture imaging radar		4	

=== Other equipment ===
- HMMWV 1165A1/B3 wheeled armored vehicle - 3 units;
- Condor wheeled armored personnel carrier - 12 units;
- Protec-Fire MAN 432 4x4 airport crash tender - 8 units;
- Protec-Fire MTEC 670 6x6 airport crash tender - 15 units;
- Unimog U1300L airport crash tender used in Field Firing Range of Alcochete - 3 units;
- Mercedes-Benz 1823 Atego;
- Caterpillar D6H bulldozers - 2 units.

== Aerobatic teams ==
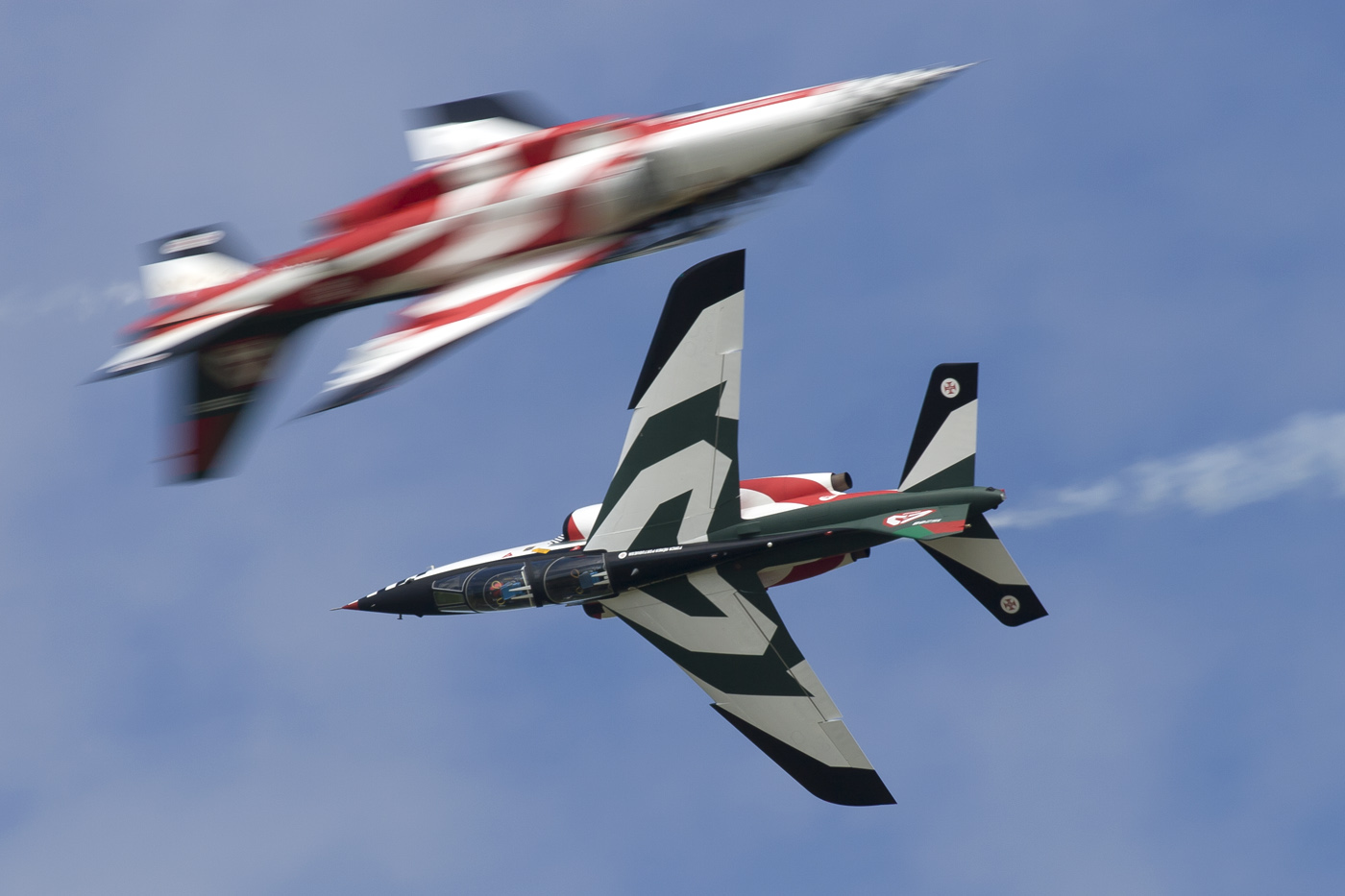
Asas de Portugal in an aerobatic flight in 2006

The Portuguese Air Force included two aerobatic teams, the Asas de Portugal (Wings of Portugal) and the Rotores de Portugal (Rotors of Portugal), both being currently inactive.

The Asas de Portugal (frequently abbreviated as Asas) was the fixed wing flight national demonstration team of Portugal. It was part of the 103 Squadron, based at the BA11, Beja and operated Alpha Jet aircraft. The team was first activated in 1977, with Cessna T-37 aircraft, being the heir of the old aerobatic teams Dragões and São Jorge, which employed F-84G aircraft and were active until the early 1960s. The Asas was deactivated in 1990, when its T-37 were phased out. The team was reactivated in 1997, then equipped with Alpha Jet, being active until 1998. It was again active during 2001 and finally from 2005 to 2010. Despite inactivation of the Asas in 2010, the Alpha Jet of the 103 Squadron continued to be painted with the livery of the team, until the phasing out of the aircraft in 2018.

The Rotores de Portugal (frequently abbreviated as Rotores) was the rotorcraft flight national demonstration team of Portugal. It was part of the 552 Squadron, based at the BA11, Beja and operated Alouette III helicopters. The Rotores was first created in 1976, being active until 1980. It was again active from 1982 to 1992, from 1993 to 1994, from 2004 to 2005 and finally from 2006 to 2010. From 2006, the Alouette III used by the team sported a special colorful livery applied over the helicopters standard camouflage. This livery continued to be sported by these helicopters even after the inactivation of Rotores, until the phasing out of the Alouette III in 2020.

== Personnel ==
=== Rank structure ===
Accordingly, with their level of responsibility and authority, the military personnel of the FAP is divided in three categories: officers (oficiais), sergeants (sargentos) and other ranks (praças). Officers are further divided in three subcategories: general officers (oficiais generais), senior officers (oficiais superiores) and junior officers (oficiais subalternos).

==== Officers ====
NATO code	OF-10	OF-9	OF-8	OF-7	OF-6	OF-5	OF-4	OF-3	OF-2	OF-1
Portuguese Air Force
Portuguese Air Force	Marechal da Força Aérea	General	Tenente-general	Major-general	Brigadeiro-general	Coronel	Tenente-coronel	Major	Capitão	Tenente	Alferes

==== Other ranks ====
NATO code	OR-9		OR-8	OR-7	OR-6	OR-5		OR-4	OR-3	OR-2		OR-1
Portuguese Air Force
Portuguese Air Force	Sargento-mor	Sargento-chefe	Sargento-ajudante	Primeiro-sargento	Segundo-sargento	Furriel	Segundo-furriel	Cabo-de-secção	Cabo-adjunto	Primeiro-cabo	Segundo-cabo	Soldado

=== Occupational groups ===
Accordingly, with their training and role, each member of the FAP is part of an occupational group designated "specialty".

==== Officers ====
The officers specialties are: Pilots aviators (PILAV), Aeronautical engineers (ENGAER), Aerodromes engineers (ENGAED), Electrical engineers (ENGEL), Physicians (MED), Aeronautical administration (ADMAER), Jurists (JUR), Psychologists (PSI), Navigators (NAV), Communications and cryptography operations technicians (TOCC), Meteorology operations technicians (TOMET), Air circulation and traffic radar operations technicians (TOCART), Interception conduct operations technicians (TOCI), Air materiel maintenance technicians (TMMA), Ground materiel maintenance technicians (TMMT), Electrical materiel maintenance technicians (TMMEL), Armament and equipment maintenance technicians (TMAEQ), Infrastructures maintenance technicians (TMI), Supply technicians (TABST), IT technicians (TINF), Personnel and administrative support technicians (TPAA), Health technicians (TS), Air police (PA) and Chiefs of music band (CHBM).

Only the officers of the PILAV speciality can reach the ranks of lieutenant-general and general. The officers of the engineers, MED, ADMAER, JUR and PSI specialities can reach the rank of major-general. Those of the NAV, technicians and PA specialities can reach the rank of colonel. Those of the CHBM speciality can reach the rank of lieutenant-colonel.

==== Sergeants and other ranks ====
The sergeants and other ranks specialties are: Communications operators (OPCOM), Meteorology operators (OPMET), Air circulation and traffic radar operators (OPCART), Detection radar operators (OPRDET), IT operators (OPINF), Assistance and rescue systems operators (OPSAS), Air materiel mechanics (MMA), Ground materiel mechanics (MMT), Electricity mechanics (MELECT), Electronics mechanics (MELECA), Aircraft electricity and instruments mechanics (MELIAV), Armament and equipment mechanics (MARME), Supply (ABS), Infrastructure construction and maintenance (CMI), Air police (PA), Secretariat and service support (SAS) and Musicians (MUS).

=== Symbols ===
The Portuguese Air Force has adopted several symbols to represent itself and promote the esprit de corps. The present rules for the display of the military aircraft insignia and fin flash were established in 1980, resulting from an update of the rules established in 1950.

The military aircraft insignia is the traditional Cross of the Order of Christ on a white roundel. In the aircraft, this insignia is displayed on the upper surface of the left wing, on the lower surface of the right wing and on both sides of the area of the fuselage between the wings and the horizontal stabilizers. Camouflaged aircraft do not display the insignia on the wings. A gray low visibility version of the insignia is occasionally applied on some aircraft.

The Cross of the Order of Christ has been the insignia of the Portuguese military aviation since 1918, replacing the previous red and green roundels which were in use before. This insignia was originally applied on the upper and lower surfaces of both wings of the Army and naval aircraft. Usually, the Cross of the Order of Christ was applied over a white circle, although in some cases - especially in naval aircraft from the 1940s on - the circle was eliminated, with the Cross being applied directly on the surfaces of the aircraft. In the 1940s, the Army aircraft started to display the insignia also on the sides of the fuselage, while most of the naval aircraft continued to display it only on the wings. After the end of the World War II, the naval aircraft adopted the display of the insignia only on the upper surface of the left wing and on the lower surface of the right wing.

The fin flash used by the military aircraft is a simplified version of the national flag, without the Portuguese coat of arms. Early Portuguese military aircraft displayed the whole rudder painted with the green and red colours of the national flag, usually with the Portuguese coat of arms applied in the middle. From the late 1920s, this was changed for the Army aircraft which instead started to display the national flag reduced to its rectangular form applied on the fin. From the 1940s, the present simplified version of the national flag without the coat of arms started to be applied on most Army aircraft, this version being established as the standard fin flash in 1950. Most naval aircraft, however, continued to display the whole rudder painted with the colors of the national flag with the coat of arms until the 1940s and without it from then on.

The Portuguese Air Force has a system of heraldry to represent itself, as well as its units. This includes coats of arms topped by a distinctive aeronautical coronet, as well as heraldic parade standards, guidons and pennons. The coat of arms of the Air Force is azure, a spread eagle or, beaked gules. The motto is Ex Mero Motu.

== See also ==
- Military aviation
- Military of Portugal
- Portuguese Armed Forces
- Portuguese Air Force Academy
- Portuguese Naval Aviation
- Portuguese Colonial War
- NATO
- List of aircraft of the Portuguese Air Force
- List of Portuguese Air Force bases
- List of Portuguese Air Force aircraft squadrons
- Portuguese military aircraft serials
- Real Thaw
- Portuguese Army Light Aviation Unit
- Asas de Portugal
- Rotores de Portugal
- Polícia Aérea
- 751 Squadron
- Parachute Troops School
- Portuguese Paratroop Nurses

== Sources ==
- Abecasis, José Krus (1985). Bordo de Ataque. Coimbra.
- Cardoso, Edgar (1981). História da Força Aérea Portuguesa. Amadora: Gratelo SARL.
- Cardoso, Edgar (1963). Presença da Força Aérea em Angola.
- Lapa, Albino (1928). Aviação Portuguesa.
- Lopes, Mario C. (November 1999). "Les avions Avro au Portugal: des inconnu aux plus célèbres" [Portuguese Avro Aircraft: From the Unknown to the Most Famous]. Avions: Toute l'Aéronautique et son histoire (in French) (80): 36–41. ISSN 1243-8650.
- Lopes, Mário Canongia (1989). Os Aviões da Cruz de Cristo. Lisbon: Dinalivro.
- Lopes, Mario Canongia (November 2000). "Curtiss Mohawk et Supermarine Spitfire, les premières chasseurs monoplans du Portugal" [The Curtiss Mohawk and Supermarine Spitfire, the First Portuguese Fighter Monoplanes]. Avions: Toute l'Aéronautique et son histoire (in French) (92): 20–23. ISSN 1243-8650.
- Lopez, Mario Canoniga (August–November 1990). "Fighters of the Cross of Christ". Air Enthusiast (13): 13–25. ISSN 0143-5450.
- Lopes, Mario Canongia (December 2000). "Quand des Spitfire défendaient la neutralité du Portugal" [When the Spitfires Had to Defend Portuguese Neutrality]. Avions: Toute l'Aéronautique et son histoire (in French) (93): 52–58. ISSN 1243-8650.
- Lopes, Mario Canoniga. "Talkback". Air Enthusiast. No. 9, February–May 1979. p. 79. ISSN 0143-5450
- Mimoso e Carvalho, António & Tavares, Luís (January 2001). "Ju 52/3m ge, Ju 52/3m g8e et "Toucan": Les Junkers 52 au Portugal" [The Portuguese Junkers 52s]. Avions: Toute l'Aéronautique et Son Histoire (in French) (94): 32–37. ISSN 1243-8650.
- Mimoso e Carvalho, António & Tavares, Luís (February 2001). "Les opérations des Junkers 52 au Portugal" [Portuguese Ju 52 Operations]. Avions: Toute l'Aéronautique et Son Histoire (in French) (95): 48–53. ISSN 1243-8650.
- Santos, J. Trindade dos (June 1978). "Aviação Naval" [Naval Aviation]. Revista da Armada (in Portuguese) (81). Lisbon: Portuguese Navy: 15–21. Archived from the original on 22 November 2021.
- Soares, A.J. Silva (August 2002). "A Extinção da Aviação Naval - Conclusão" [The Extinguish of the Naval Aviation - Conclusion]. Revista da Armada (in Portuguese) (356). Lisbon: Portuguese Navy: 8–11. Archived from the original on 22 November 2021.
- van den Oever, Jan (October 1993). "La Força Aerea Portuguesa de 1911 à nos jours (2)" [The Portuguese Air Force from 1911 to Today, Part 2]. Le Fana de l'Aviation (in French) (287): 26–32. ISSN 0757-4169.
