= João de Sande Magalhães Mexia Ayres de Campos, 2nd Count of Ameal =

Portuguese politician and diplomat

The Count of Ameal
- ComC, CvNSC
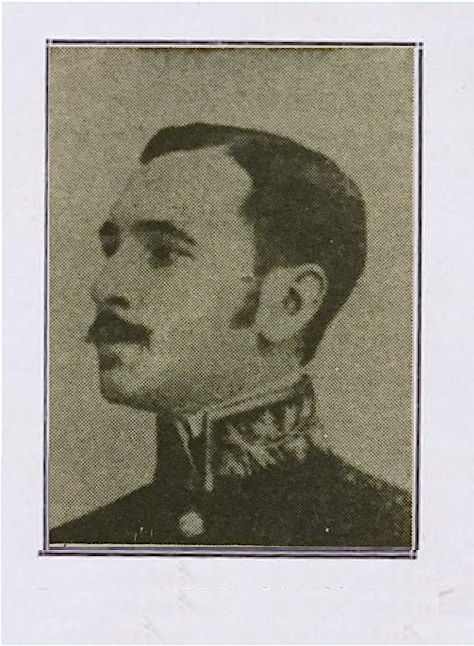
- The 2nd Count of Ameal in the uniform of the Portuguese diplomatic corps, c. 1900.
- Full name: João de Sande Magalhães Mexia Ayres de Campos, 1st Viscount Ameal, 2nd Count of Ameal
- Born: 11 May 1877; Coimbra, Portugal
- Died: 22 December 1952 (aged 75); Ota, Alenquer, Portugal
- Noble family: Ayres de Campos
- Spouse: D. Maria Benedita Falcão Barbosa de Azevedo e Bourbon
- Father: João Maria Correia Ayres de Campos, 1st Count of Ameal
- Mother: D. Maria Amélia de Sande Mexia Vieira da Mota
- Occupation: politician, diplomat

João de Sande Magalhães Mexia Ayres de Campos, 2nd Count of Ameal ComC CvNSC (Coimbra, 11 May 1877 – Ota, Alenquer, 22 December 1952) was a Portuguese politician and career diplomat, having served in this capacity in the Hague, and also as Secretary to Portugal's Minister of Foreign Affairs, Venceslau de Lima. He was as a key participant in the failed republican Municipal Library Elevator Coup of 1908, which targeted the constitutional monarchy of King Charles I and what were perceived as the dictatorial powers of prime minister João Franco.

== Early life and marriage ==
João Ayres de Campos was born in Coimbra, the eldest son of João Maria Correia Ayres de Campos and his wife Maria Amélia de Sande Mexia Vieira da Mota, niece and sole heir of Carlos Pinto Vieira da Mota, 1st Count of Juncal. He was granted the courtesy title Viscount of Ameal (Portuguese: Visconde do Ameal) by Carlos I of Portugal in 1901, at the age of 23, upon his father's accession to the peerage as Count of Ameal. These titles were confirmed by king Manuel II in exile in 1920. He succeeded to the comital title at his father's death in 1920.

On 21 November 1901 he married Maria Benedita Falcão Barbosa de Azevedo e Bourbon, of a prominent Bragan family, and sister of the 2nd Count of Azevedo.

== Revolutionary politics and attempted coup ==
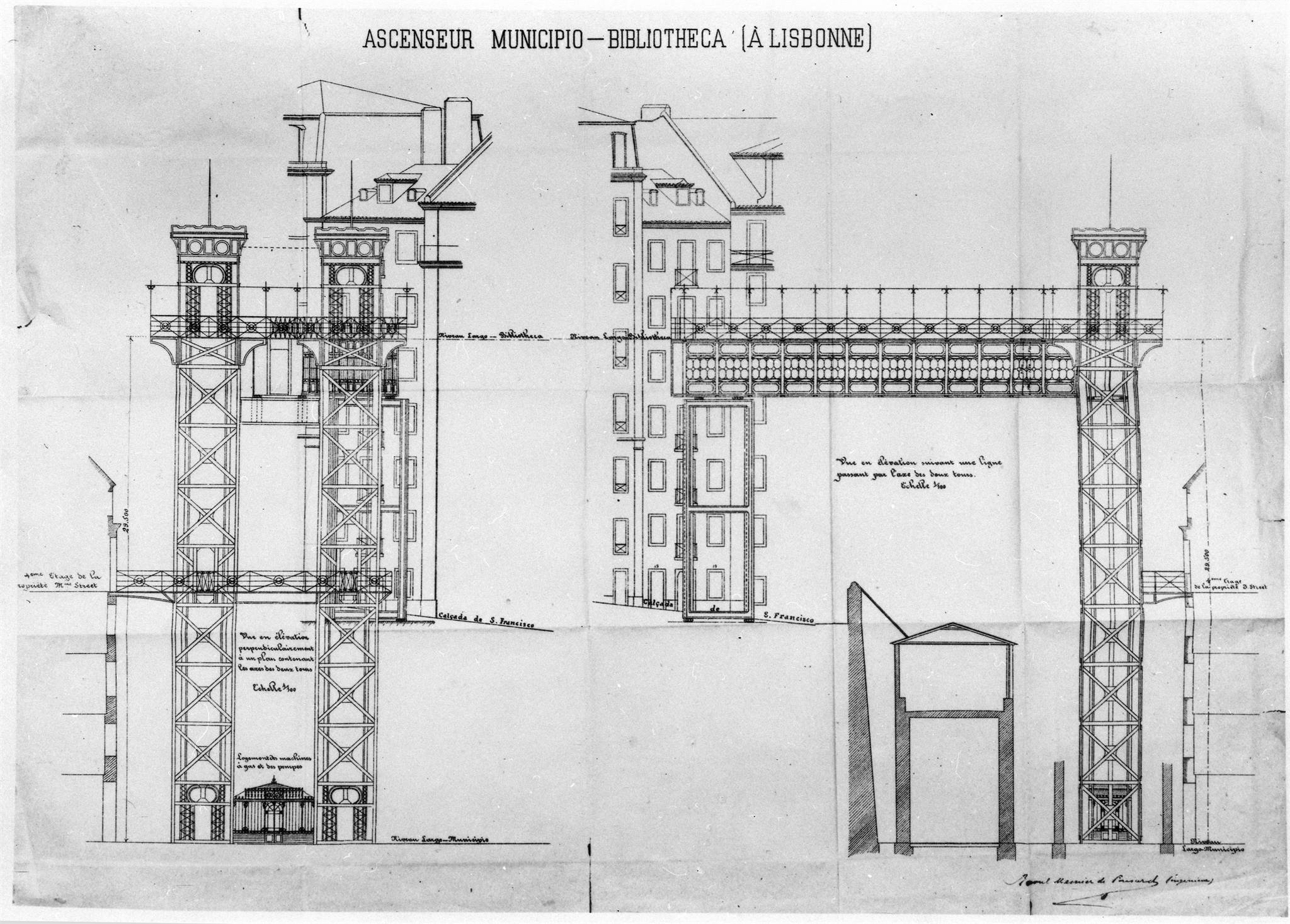
Plans of Mesnier de Ponsard's elevator near the Municipal Library in Lisbon, owned by the then Viscount of Ameal

In 1905, João Ayres de Campos was part of the Dissidência Progressista, an influential left-wing breakaway from the Partido Progressista in the last years of Portugal's Liberal Monarchy, led by José Maria de Alpoim. The party was staunchly opposed to the conservative Partido Regenerador, to which his father had belonged throughout his political career, and Alpuim's wing had close ties with Afonso Costa's republican movement.

With several members of this group and in cooperation with Costa's Republican Party, João (then styled Viscount of Ameal) was involved in the failed Municipal Library Elevator Coup, one month before the Lisbon Regicide. The coup derives its name from the large public elevator designed by Raoul Mesnier de Ponsard and owned by Ameal near Lisbon City Hall outside which the conspirators assembled on the afternoon of 28 January 1908, and where many were arrested when a policeman became suspicious as the elevator was not in service. Its organisers were opposed to the administrative dictatorship of Prime Minister João Franco, and to King Carlos I's perceived protection of Franco's Liberal Regeneration Party.

Unlike co-conspirators Afonso Costa, António Egas Moniz and the Viscount of Ribeira Brava, among others, Ameal avoided arrest, having managed to escape to Galicia disguised as a campino; a detailed plan for the intended coup was however found among his papers, testifying to his prominence in the plot. In a later interview to the Spanish periodical La Voz de Galicia, he reminisced about his involvement in the attempted revolution, acknowledging that he had hosted the conspirators in his property and given them a key to the premises of the elevator. He did not, however, elaborate on the extent of his participation in the tentative coup d'etat.

== Later life ==
Ameal remained in Spain after the dismantlement of the Elevador conspiracy, and only resumed his political career upon the proclamation of the Portuguese Republic on 5 October 1910. His later public life was developed under the auspices of the First Portuguese Republic. However, he eventually became disillusioned with the new regime's instability, and by the early 1930s he welcomed the dawn of Salazar's authoritarian Estado Novo – of which his son João Francisco de Barbosa Azevedo de Sande Ayres de Campos, later 3rd Count of Ameal, was one of the leading ideologues.

He and his wife were killed in a car accident in Ota, near Lisbon, in 1952. He is buried in the monumental Gothic Revival mausoleum of the Counts of Ameal in Coimbra's Conchada cemetery.

His only son, a prolific author and a committed monarchist, succeeded to his titles.

== See also ==
- Municipal Library Elevator Coup
- Progressive Dissidence
- José Maria de Alpoim
- João Maria Correia Ayres de Campos, 1st Count of Ameal
- João Ameal

Portuguese nobility
Preceded by João Maria Correia Ayres de Campos, 1st Count of Ameal	Count of Ameal; 1920–1957	Succeeded by João Francisco de Barbosa Azevedo de Sande Ayres de Campos, 3rd Count of Ameal
