= Military and Technical Training Center of the Air Force =

Airport in Ota, Portugal

Military and Technical Training Center of the Air Force Centro de Formação Militar e Técnica da Força Aérea
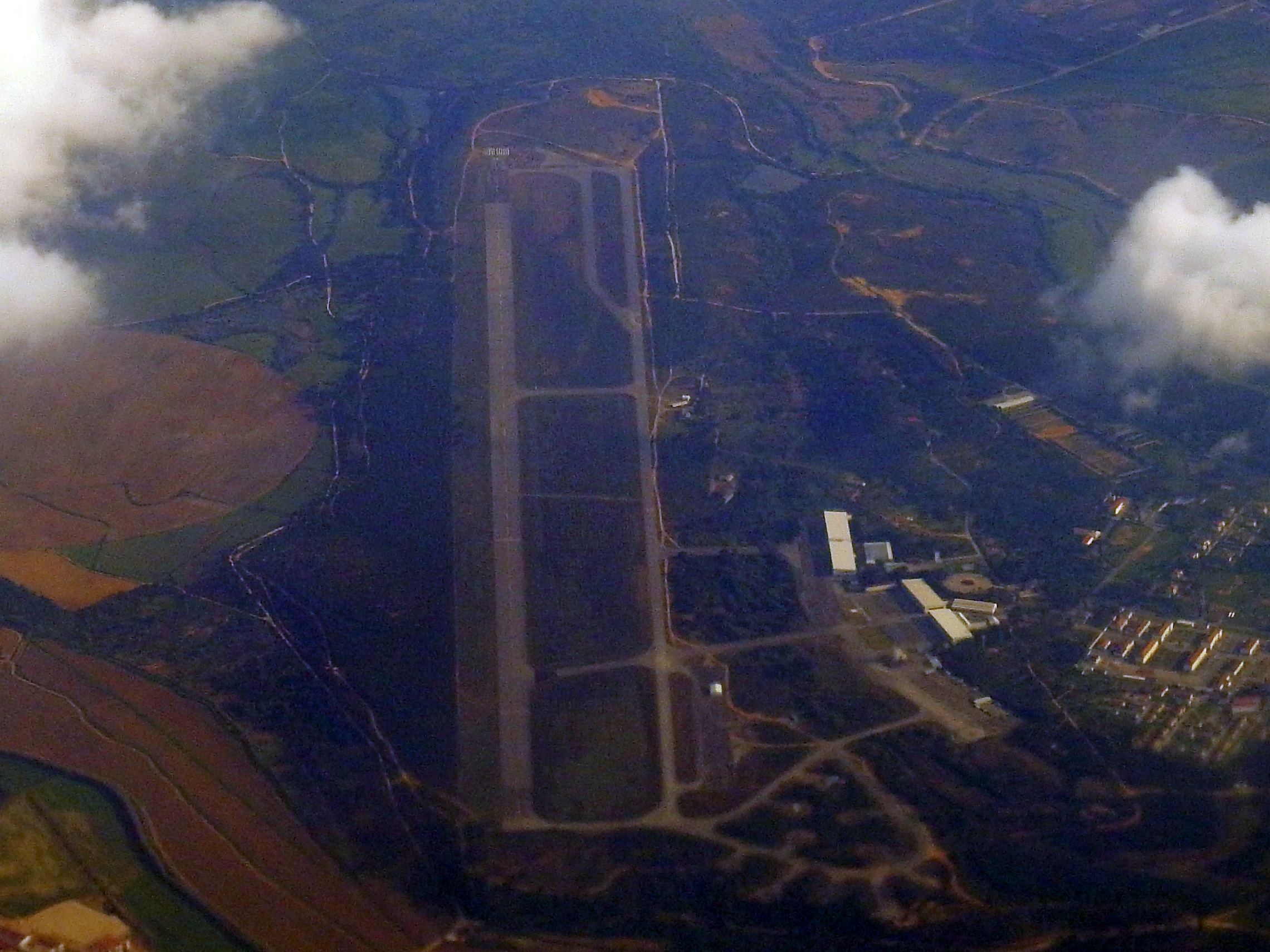
- Aerial view of the CFMTFA and of its strip
- IATA: none; ICAO: LPOT

Summary
- Airport type: Military
- Operator: Portuguese Air Force
- Location: Ota (Alenquer)
- Built: 1930s
- In use: 1938-1992
- Elevation AMSL: 140 ft / 43 m
- Coordinates: 39°05′32″N 8°58′03″W

Maps
- Location in Mainland Portugal
- Interactive map of Military and Technical Training Center of the Air Force

Runways
Direction	Length		Surface
Direction	ft	m	Surface
18/36	8,202	2,500	Asphalt

The Military and Technical Training Center of the Air Force (Portuguese: Centro de Formação Militar e Técnica da Força Aérea) or CFMTFA is the unit responsible for the military, humanistic, technical and scientific training of the personnel of the Portuguese Air Force. It is located in Ota (Alenquer Municipality), occupying the facilities of the former Ota Air Base (officially, the Air Base No 2).

Around 90% of the personnel of the Portuguese Air Force is trained at Ota.

== Mission ==
The CFMTFA is responsible to provide the following training for the Portuguese Air Force personnel:

1. Training and promotion course for the sergeants of the permanent staff;
2. Training courses for the engaged staff (corporals, sergeants and officers) of the several specialties of the Air Force;
3. Basic military training for the volunteer engaged staff;
4. Vocational training courses;
5. Refreshment or specialization courses;
6. Training of instructors;
7. Vocational training for the civilian staff of the Air Force;
8. Other training courses with interest for the Air Force or for the Ministry of National Defense.

== Air infrastructure ==
The CFMTFA occupies the facilities of a former air base deactivated in 1992. The air infrastructures include a 2,500 m (8,200 ft) long asphalt certified runway. However, as the unit does not maintain permanent flying operations, the air traffic control, meteorology, fire rescue and fuel supply services are deactivated.

The Ota air facilities were the planned site for the Ota Airport – the future new Lisbon international airport – from the late 1990s. The CFMTFA would then be transferred to the Ovar Air Base. The project was, however, aborted in January 2008 when the decision was taken that the new Lisbon airport would be built in the area of the present Field Firing Range of Alcochete.

== History ==
The origins of the present CFMTFA lay in the Air Base No 2 of the Aeronáutica Militar (the Aviation branch of the Portuguese Army), inaugurated on 14 April 1940 by the Portuguese President Óscar Carmona. At that time, the base was home of a fighter squadron equipped with Gloster Gladiator aircraft, two day bomber squadrons equipped with Junkers Ju-86 and two night bomber squadrons equipped with Junkers Ju 52.

During the World War II, Ota became the main fighter aviation base of the Aeronáutica Militar, receiving squadrons of Supermarine Spitfire and Bell P-39 Airacobra fighters, as well as Bristol Blenheim light bombers.

In the 1950s, Ota continued to be the main fighter base of the now independent Portuguese Air Force, housing the Operational Fighter Aviation Group, initially composed of F-47 Thunderbolt fighter squadrons. In 1954, the F-47 were replaced by F-84G Thunderjet jet fighters, with a jet fighter training unit equipped with T-33 Shooting Star being also activated. In this period, the base was also the home of the São Jorge and Dragões aerobatic teams, equipped with F-84 jets. In the late 1950s, the F-84 started to be replaced by F-86 Sabre jet fighters.

The fighter and fighter training units were transferred to the newly open Monte Real Air Base in 1958. From then on, Ota Air Base becomes mainly an elementary flight training base, operating De Havilland Chipmunk aircraft. From the 1970s to the 1990s, it was also home of a liaison unit equipped with Cessna FTB-337G Skymaster.

In 1960, the base becomes also the home of the Specialists Technicians Training Group of the Air Force (GITE, Grupo de Instrução de Técnicos Especialistas). The GITE is transformed in the Training Center no. 7 in 1975, being renamed Training Center no. 2 in 1976.

In 1992, the Ota Air Base is deactivated as air base, merging with the Training Center no. 2 and becoming the Military and Technical Training Center of the Air Force.
