= João Ameal =

Portuguese historian, political theorist, novelist, and politician

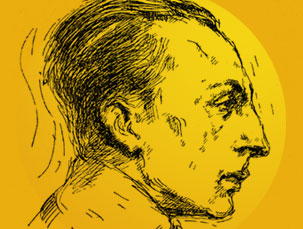
- Portrait drawing of João Ameal
- Full name: João Francisco de Barbosa Azevedo de Sande Ayres de Campos, 2nd Viscount Ameal, 3rd Count of Ameal
- Born: 23 October 1902; Coimbra, Portugal
- Died: 23 November 1982 (aged 80); Lisbon, Portugal
- Noble family: Ayres de Campos
- Spouse: Maria Teresa de Castro Sottomayor
- Father: João de Sande Magalhães Mexia Ayres de Campos, 2nd Count of Ameal
- Mother: Maria Benedita Falcão Barbosa de Azevedo e Bourbon
- Occupation: Politician, historian, novelist

João Ameal was the literary pseudonym of Portuguese historian, political theorist, novelist and politician João Francisco de Barbosa Azevedo de Sande Ayres de Campos, 3rd Count of Ameal, GCC, OSE (Coimbra, 23 October 1902 – Lisbon, 23 November 1982). His surname is also graphed Aires de Campos in contemporary Portuguese orthography, and he himself signed it in both forms. Both as an author and as a politician, he was active chiefly during Portugal's Estado Novo, and is regarded as one of the regime's leading intellectuals and historiographers. He is especially renowned for his widespread História de Portugal ('History of Portugal'), a multi-volume work first published in 1940, and for the several historical studies which he authored throughout his life, most of which are shaped by his integralist convictions.

== Family and early life ==
João Francisco de Barbosa Azevedo de Sande Ayres de Campos was the son of João de Sande Magalhães Mexia Ayres de Campos, 2nd Count of Ameal (11 May 1877 - 22 December 1957), and his wife Maria Benedita Falcão Barbosa de Azevedo e Bourbon, sister of the 2nd Count of Azevedo. His father was a career diplomat, having served in this capacity in the Hague, and also as Secretary to Portugal's Minister of Foreign Affairs, Venceslau de Lima. During João's infancy, his father was briefly exiled in Galicia as a result of his involvement in a failed republican coup - returning upon the proclamation of the Portuguese Republic in 1910.

He was the grandson of renowned Coimbra politician and art collector João Maria Correia Ayres de Campos, 1st Count of Ameal; his great-grandfather, João Correia Ayres de Campos, a lawyer by profession, had himself been a historian of considerable reputation, namely within the fields of palaeography and medieval studies. Following in the footsteps of his grandfather and great-grandfather, João studied Law, graduating from the University of Lisbon in 1921.

His parents would die together in a car accident in Ota, near Lisbon, in 1952; until his father's death, he was styled Viscount of Ameal (Portuguese: Visconde do Ameal), a subsidiary title originally created for his father by king Carlos I in 1901 and confirmed by exiled king Manuel II in 1920.

In 1928 he married Maria Teresa de Castro Sottomayor, only daughter of Dom Miguel Nicolau de Sottomayor, with issue.

== Politics ==
From a young age, João Ameal was affiliated with the movement Integralismo Lusitano, founded in his native Coimbra in 1914, whose ranks included his friends António Sardinha, Alberto de Monsaraz, José Adriano Pequito Rebelo, José Hipólito Vaz Raposo, Leão Ramos Ascensão, Luís de Almeida Braga, and Francisco Rolão Preto. A group of Catholic and royalist intellectuals influenced by Counter-Enlightenment ideology, namely by the thought of Charles Maurras and the Action Française, they provided a strong critique of Portugal's First Republic, and of contemporary parliamentary regimes. In 1934, he was the main author of the influential Cartaz-Decálogo do Estado Novo, comprising the ten key principles of Salazar's political programme, the first systematic exposition of the regime's social, economic and imperial vision - a document strongly informed by integralist and corporatist thought and by Pope Leo XIII's writings on Catholic social doctrine.

Unlike many of his integralist companions, who would become disillusioned with Salazar's regime on account of its enduring republicanism, Ameal remained largely faithful to the Estado Novo, and never shifted his allegiance to its political opposition. He would serve as a deputy to Portugal's National Assembly for four legislatures, between 1942 and 1957, and was also a member of the Central Committee of the Portuguese Legion, editing its bulletin for some years. Despite these commitments, he remained a convicted monarchist throughout his life, founding and directing the Acção Realista Portuguesa, which supported the prerogatives of the exiled king Manuel II of Portugal. Ameal's unwavering support of Manuel II until his death in 1932 was a further point of divergence form his former Integralist companions, since the mainstream of the movement favoured the branch descended from the traditionalist king Miguel I. Upon Manuel's death without heirs, these would become the sole pretenders to the Portuguese throne.

A committed Catholic, he was a founding member of Portugal's Association of Catholic Writers (Associação dos Escritores Católicos), and was received in audience by Pope Pius XII at the Vatican in this capacity in 1953.

== Writings ==
João Ameal began his literary career at the age of 17 with the novel O Que os Meus Olhos Viram (1919); this was followed by the chronicles Em Voz Alta e em Voz Baixa (1920) and the romances Os Olhos Cinzentos (1922), Nossa Senhora da Morte (1922) and Religião do Espaço (1925). He published also Balões Venezianos, a compilation of chronicles, and Claridade. He abandoned the writing of fiction in the 1920s.

As a journalist, he directed the Ilustração Portuguesa and the monarchist publication Acção Realista; he briefly replaced Manuel Pestana Reis at the head of the Diário da Manhã in 1940. He was the chief editor of the newspaper A Noite in 1939 and collaborated with Diário de Notícias, writing also for the periodicals Nação Portuguesa, Rumo, Época, O Dia, Gazeta de Coimbra and A Flama. In the 1940s and 1950s, he collaborated with the radio Emissora Nacional, supplying a regular programme devoted to literary criticism.

Ameal's historical and political works, often informed by his traditionalist sensibilities, included the studies Legitimismo, Tradicionalismo e Constitucionalismo (originally conceived as a preface to his relative Miguel de Sottomayor's work A Realeza de D. Miguel, 1929, a Legitimist revision of Portuguese 19th century history), Portugal Restaurado (a collaboration with Alfredo Pimenta and others) and Falência da Democracia (1933), a criticism of contemporary Liberal parliamentary regimes. Sympathising with the figure of defeated king Miguel I, as did most contemporary traditionalists, he authored several historical studies dedicated to him, including Verdadeiro Perfil de El-Rei Dom Miguel (1940), Dom Miguel e a Vilafrancada (1940) and Dom Miguel Infante (originally a preface to the first Portuguese edition of Arthur Herchen's Dom Miguel I, König von Portugal, 1946).

In 1928, Ameal published the political book A Contra-revolução ('The Counter-revolution'), inspired by the contemporary impact of Mussolini, in which he sketches out his hopes for the regime that was then about to replace the First Portuguese Republic.

An enthusiast of the thought of St Thomas Aquinas, he penned several studies of his work, including São Tomás de Aquino: Iniciação ao Estudo da sua Figura e da sua Obra (1938), São Tomás de Aquino, Mestre da Idade-Nova (1938), and A Revolução Tomista (1952); he also translated Fr. Tomás de Perrancho's book Santo Tomás de Aquino from the original Spanish.

Strongly committed to Catholic apologetics, Ameal published the manifesto Nacionalismo e Patriotismo: Deveres Para Com a Pátria Segundo a Doutrina Católica (1940), and later wrote a lengthy introduction to the first Portuguese translation of G. K. Chesterton's Orthodoxy, titled A Revolução de Chesterton (1958).

His extensive História de Portugal (History of Portugal, first published in 1940 and awarded the Alexandre Herculano Prize in 1943) underwent several re-editions, and has become a popular reference book in the field of Portuguese history, rendering João Ameal well known among the general public.

== Honours ==
On 30 January 1965 João Ameal received the Great Cross of the Military Order of Christ in Lisbon's Palácio Foz. On 30 June 1971, in attention to his services to Portuguese culture, he was elevated to Grand Official of the Military Order of St James of the Sword.

== See also ==
- João Maria Correia Ayres de Campos, 1st Count of Ameal
- Count of Ameal
- Palácio da Justiça (Coimbra)
- João Correia Ayres de Campos

Portuguese nobility
Preceded by João de Sande Magalhães Mexia Ayres de Campos, 2nd Count of Ameal	Count of Ameal; 1952–1982	Succeeded by Miguel de Sande de Castro Sotomaior de Azevedo e Bourbon Ayres de Campos, 4th Count of Ameal
