= João Maria Correia Ayres de Campos, 1st Count of Ameal =

Portuguese politician and antiquarian

The Count of Ameal
- GCC, CvNSC
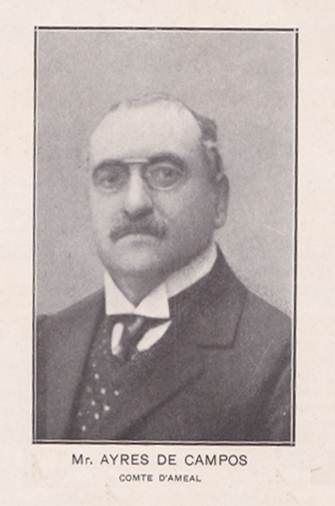
- The 1st Count of Ameal around 1900.
- Born: 5 February 1844; Coimbra, Portugal
- Died: 13 July 1920 (aged 76); Coimbra, Portugal
- Noble family: Ayres de Campos
- Spouses: D. Maria Amélia de Sande Magalhães Mexia Vieira da Mota, Countess of Ameal
- Father: João Correia Ayres de Campos
- Mother: Leonor da Conceição
- Occupation: Politician, art collector, bibliophile

João Maria Correia Ayres de Campos (his surname also graphed Aires de Campos in contemporary Portuguese), 1st Count of Ameal, GCC, CvNSC, OOPA (Coimbra, 5 February 1847 – 13 July 1920) was a Portuguese politician and antiquarian, best known as a great art collector, maecenas and bibliophile. He is renowned chiefly for having assembled one of Portugal's largest and most important private art collections, as well as what was at the time the largest private library in the country; his collections are also famous for having been auctioned en masse after his death in 1920, leading to the largest auction recorded in the Iberian Peninsula (and one of the largest in Europe) on that decade. Several pieces belonging to him have since been incorporated in the collections of the Louvre, the Prado, the Museu Nacional de Arte Antiga in Lisbon and the Soares dos Reis National Museum in Porto.

== Early life and family ==
João Maria Correia Ayres de Campos was born out of wedlock in Coimbra, the son of João Correia Ayres de Campos and Leonor da Conceição. His father, a magistrate and amateur archaeologist who for a number of years represented Coimbra in the Portuguese National Assembly, only saw to his official legitimation in 1860. From his father the Count of Ameal would eventually inherit a sizeable collection of manuscripts and early printed books as well as a small number of antiquities and archaeological artefacts, a legacy which would form the basis of his own private collection.

As a young man, João Maria studied Law at the University of Coimbra – following on the footsteps of his father, who had pursued the same course of studies there in the 1830s. In 1876, he married Maria Amélia de Sande Mexia Vieira da Mota; issuing from an old landed family with tradition in the areas of magistrature and academia, she was the niece and sole heir of Carlos Pinto Vieira da Mota, 1st Count of Juncal, who would distinguish himself in the last decades of the nineteenth century as head of the Portuguese Supreme Court of Justice. They had four children.

His eldest son and successor was João de Sande Magalhães Mexia Ayres de Campos, 1st Viscount of Ameal, later 2nd Count of Ameal, a politician and diplomat and a key participant in the failed republican Municipal Library Elevator Coup of 1908.

His grandson, João Francisco de Barbosa Azevedo de Sande Ayres de Campos, 3rd Count of Ameal, would become a prolific author and historian during Portugal's Estado Novo, signing his works with the pseudonym João Ameal.

== Political career and honours ==
Having obtained his bachelor's degree in 1874 and his licentiate in 1875, João Maria Correia Ayres de Campos joined the Partido Regenerador, a conservative political party opposed to the Partido Progressista during the Liberal Monarchy. Its chairman for the District of Coimbra, he was elected mayor of Coimbra (at the time the country's third city in size and importance) in 1893, serving in this position until 1895. Throughout this decade he also served intermittently as deputy to the Parliament of Portugal, where he was a member of the parliamentary committees for Public Administration (1893 and 1894), Commerce and the Arts (1894) and Statistics (1897).

Over the course of his public life, Ayres de Campos would be awarded the Grand Cross of the Military Order of Christ, a knighthood in the Royal Order of the Immaculate Conception of Vila Viçosa and both the Gold and Silver Palms of the French Ordre des Palmes Académiques. In 1890, he was also received as a fellow of the Lisbon Geographic Society.

Upon his retirement from active political life in 1901, he was created Count of Ameal by king Charles I of Portugal - a title which refers to the small hamlet in the outskirts of Coimbra where his paternal ascendants had their roots and family home. On the same occasion, his eldest son - a politician and diplomat then serving in the Ministry of Foreign Affairs under Venceslau de Lima - was granted the courtesy title Viscount of Ameal.

To embellish his coat-of-arms, he chose the motto Ars Super Omnia ("Art Above All Things").

== The art collection ==
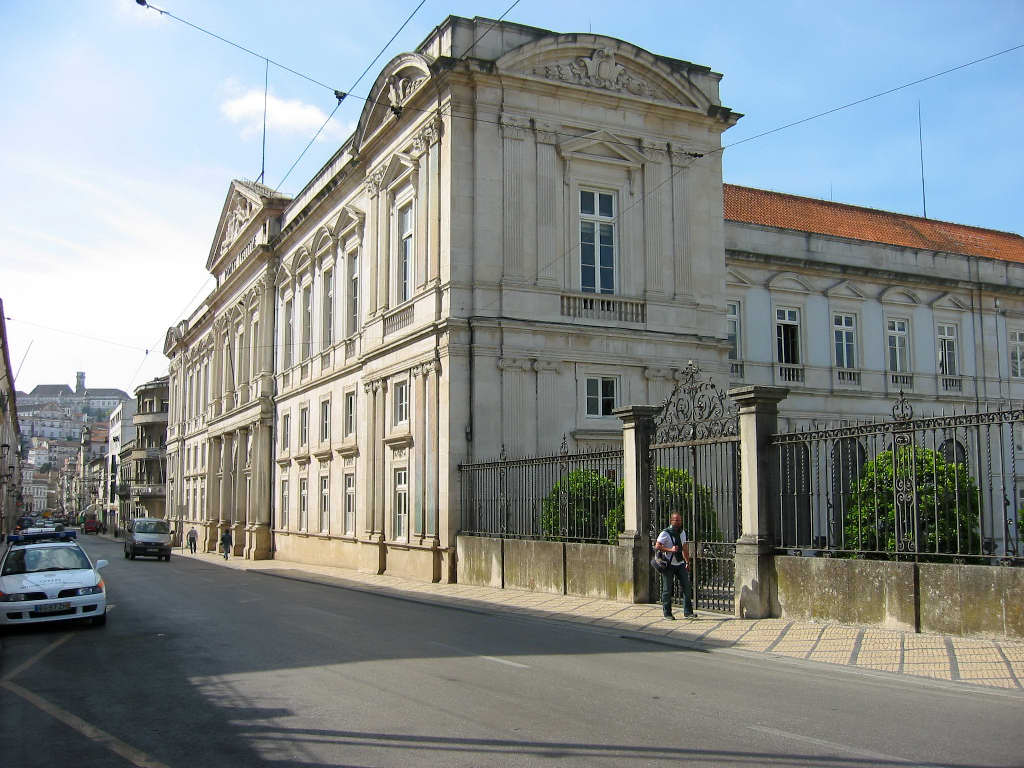
The former palace of the Counts of Ameal at Rua da Sofia, in Coimbra. The building now serves as the city's court house - the Palácio da Justiça.

João Maria Correia Ayres de Campos began to amass his large collection in the 1880s. Having bought the 16th-century buildings of the old friary and college of Saint Thomas (formerly one of the religious halls of the University of Coimbra and a base of the Dominican Order) he transformed them into a vast palatial residence, with the complex's original Renaissance-style cloister as a centerpiece. The palace's monumental Italianate portico, one of its most remarkable original features, has since been relocated to the Machado de Castro National Museum. Over the years, its rooms, several of which still retained their original gothic form despite the building's soberer classical exterior, would be filled with precious furniture, Old Master paintings and about 30.000 rare books, while the palace grew into a vibrant cultural salon.

His collection of paintings, which at its height amounted to more than 600 pieces displayed across 10 saloons, included a canvas then attributed to Caravaggio (Saint John the Baptist), one large drawing by Rembrandt (Head of a Man), a large Glorification of the Virgin by Rubens, The Earthly Paradise by Jan Brueghel (now in the Louvre) and two portraits of saints by Zurbarán. The collection further contained two canvases by Murillo, three by Greuze, four by Ribera and one canvas and four aquatints by Goya, as well as a large collection of watercolors by Turner and Delacroix.

Ameal also gathered a considerable selection of oil paintings and drawings by Salvator Rosa, an artist then virtually unknown in Portugal but one of his favourite painters, which he procured through emissaries in Italy.

An admirer of contemporary Portuguese painters, particularly of the Realist school that was then at the height of its popularity, the Count of Ameal also owned a large selection of canvases and drawings by José Malhoa, Columbano and António Silva Porto. Of the latter, he possessed the famous The Boy and His Sheep, now in the Soares dos Reis National Museum in Porto. He sponsored some contemporary Portuguese artists, namely Silva Porto's disciple Ezequiel Pereira, whom he sent to Paris and Brittany in the 1890s.

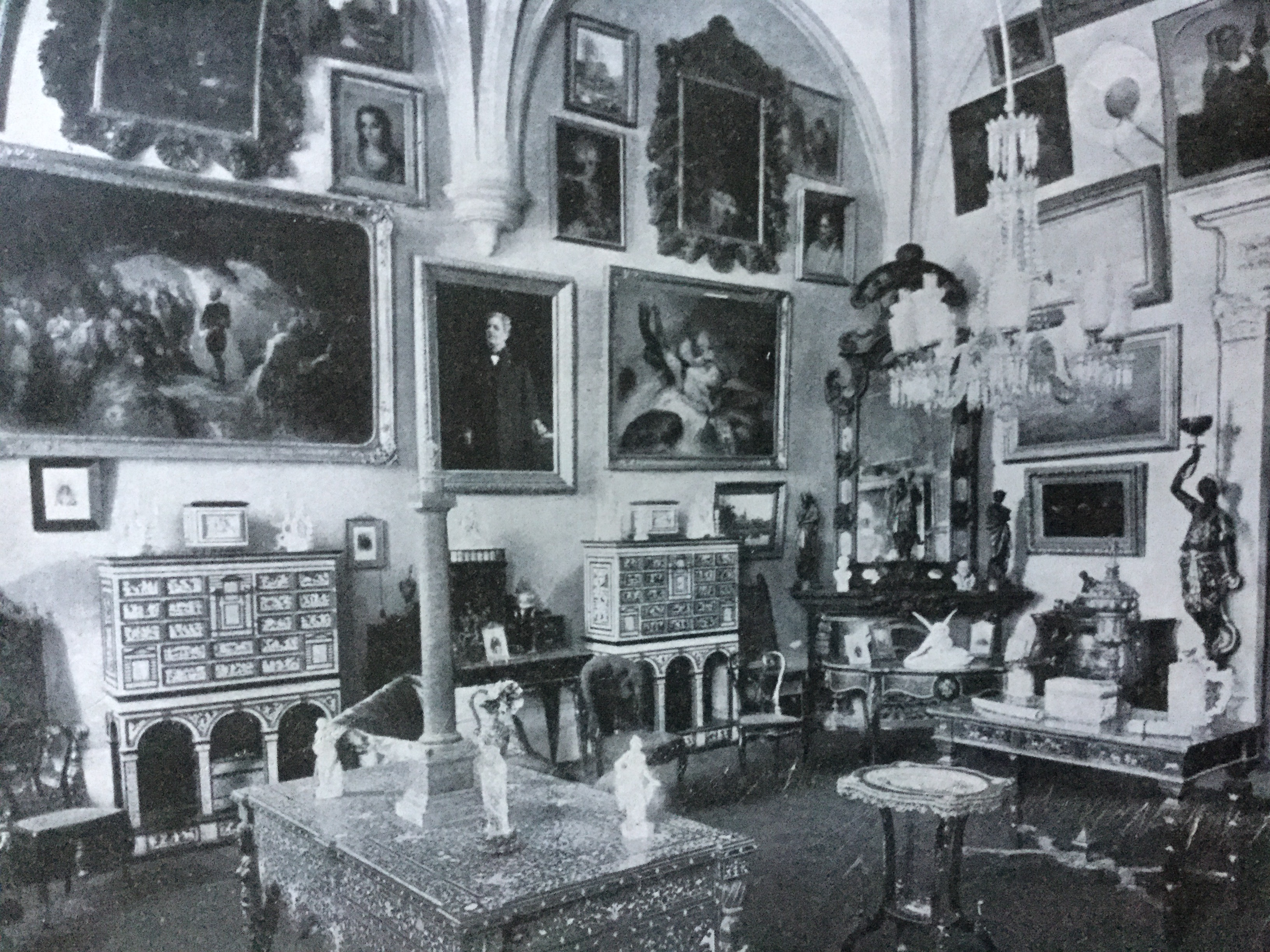
A room of the São Tomás palace whilst the residence of the Counts of Ameal, from the bilingual catalogue Collections Comte de Ameal, published in Coimbra in 1921.

Towards the end of his life, the Count came to assemble a large collection of gothic sculpture and painting, as well as one of late-medieval and early-modern Portuguese religious painting (the latter chiefly purchased after the suppression of the property of the religious orders by the Republicans in 1910).

Other important parts of the Count's collection were his selection of porcelain and Islamic faience, mostly Iberian and late-medieval, which amounted to around 800 pieces, and his numismatics collection, begun already by his father, which comprised 3558 coins.

Upon the Count's death in 1920, his widow and heirs decided to sell most of the collection, as well as to donate the palace that housed it to a religious order. For that purpose, a major auction was hastily organized in July 1921, the biggest event of the kind in the history of auctioneering in Portugal. Both the British Museum and the Louvre sent emissaries to the event, the latter having acquired a large number of porcelain pieces and most of the Count's collection of Islamic faience.

The sale of Ameal's immense library in 1924 was described in a series of chronicles by Gustavo de Matos Sequeira in the periodical O Mundo, later compiled in the book No Leilão Ameal (1925). These record the sale of his extensive collection of illuminated manuscripts, as well as of his edition of the Nuremberg Chronicle and other incunabula.

== Death and burial ==
The 1st Count of Ameal died in Coimbra in 1920, aged 74. He had designed for himself, his wife and his descendants an exquisite octagonal gothic pantheon in Coimbra's cemetery of Conchada, which was completed in 1899. The 10-meter-tall monument, comprising a relatively small chapel at ground level and a crypt with six floors beneath, has been considered one of the masterpieces of Portuguese gothic revival. Bearing a number of allusions to Dante's Divine Comedy, the structure is adorned with eagles, griffins and lilies, its spire topped by an over-lifesize statue of Beatrice. The works on this monument were led by sculptor Costa Mota Tio, who had been responsible for the revivalist reconstruction of the eastern wing of the Jerónimos Monastery in Lisbon, and include a great deal of sculpture by João Machado, famous for his work on the Buçaco Palace.

The pantheon is still in use by the Count's descendants today.

== Trivia ==
- The name of the Rua Aires de Campos, a street in central Coimbra, is often thought to refer to the Count of Ameal; in fact, its name alludes to his father, Dr. João Correia Ayres de Campos, who was a distinguished local politician and amateur archaeologist in his own right.

== See also ==
- Count of Ameal
- João Ameal
- João Correia Ayres de Campos
- Palácio da Justiça (Coimbra)

Portuguese nobility
Preceded by New creation	Count of Ameal; 1901–1920	Succeeded by João de Sande Magalhães Mexia Ayres de Campos, 2nd Count of Ameal
