= Palácio da Justiça (Coimbra) =

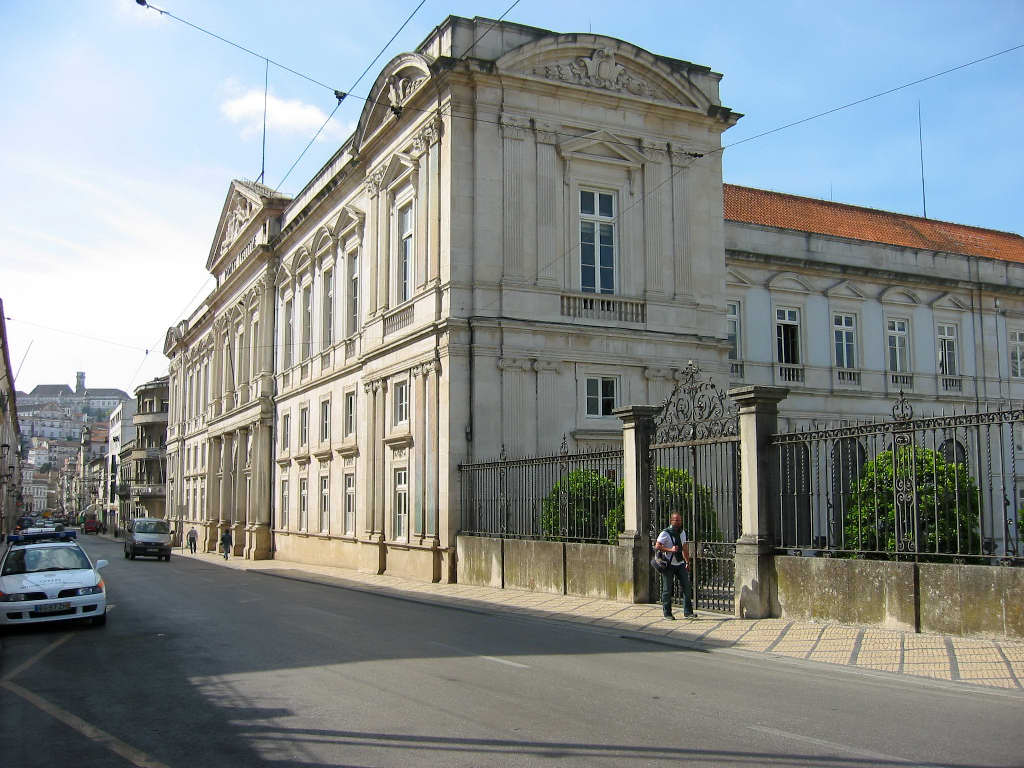
- Palácio da Justiça seen from Rua da Sofia
- Interactive map of the Palácio da Justiça area
- Former names: College of St. Thomas, Palace of the Counts of Ameal

General information
- Architectural style: Renaissance, Neoclassical
- Location: 389 Rua da Sofia, Coimbra, Portugal
- Coordinates: 40.2143°N 8.4321°W
- Construction started: 1546
- Completed: 1930s
- Owner: Ministry of Justice (Portugal)

Design and construction
- Architects: Diogo de Castilho (1540s), Silva Pinto (1895), Manuel Abreu Castelo Branco (1930)

Website
- https://www.trc.pt

The Palácio da Justiça is a historic building located in central Coimbra, Portugal, presently housing the city's Law Courts. It was formerly a religious house of the Dominican Order under the name College of St. Thomas (Portuguese: Colégio de São Tomás) and, whilst the private residence of the Counts of Ameal, was known as Palácio Ameal. Both of its former designations are still current in colloquial use.

== Religious house ==
Originally a Dominican friary and house of formation affiliated with the University of Coimbra, the College of St. Thomas was established in 1538. Its name referred to Dominican saint and Doctor of the Church Thomas Aquinas. Construction began in the 1540s under the rector Fr. Martinho de Ledesma, with plans by Asturian architect Diogo de Castilho. The educational and residential areas of the college were arranged around a central cloister. In the 18th century, the upper floor on the east side was expanded and renovated according to contemporary taste, including the addition of new windows and a balcony to the facade.

The building faces onto Rua da Sofia, the street where the colleges of several religious orders came to be concentrated. The artery is named for the Greek word Sophia (σοφία, "knowledge" or "wisdom") on this account.

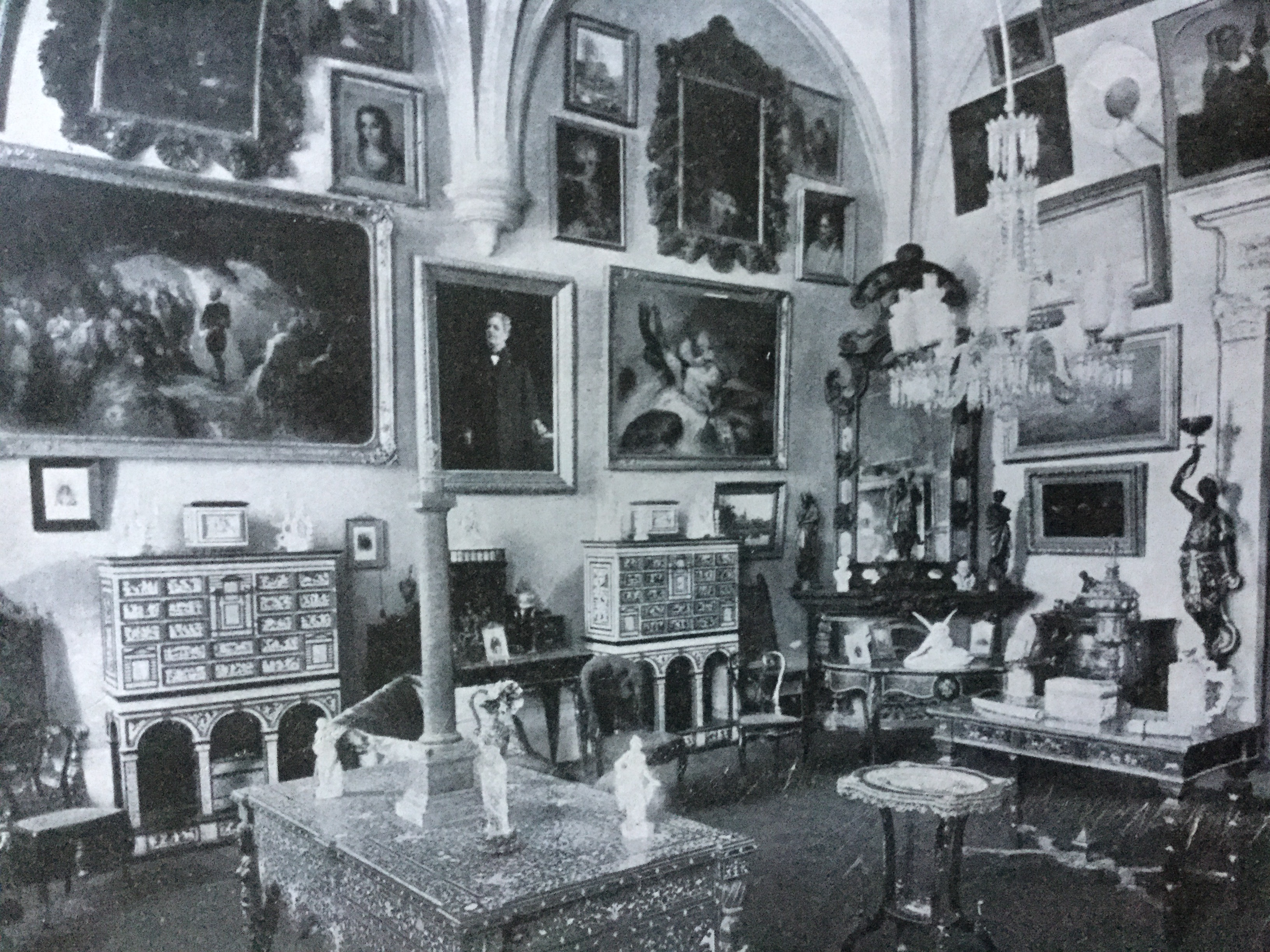
A room of the palace whilst the residence of the Counts of Ameal, with an oil portrait of João Correia Ayres de Campos visible at the centre

== Palace of the Counts of Ameal ==
After the extinction of religious orders in 1834, the building was incorporated into the National Treasury and used as a warehouse until it was acquired by João Maria Correia Ayres de Campos, 1st Count of Ameal. In 1895, architect Silva Pinto was hired to adapt it to its new residential function using a neoclassical revivalist design, but most of its significant original features, including its cloister, several of its vaulted late-Gothic interiors and its Renaissance-style portico, were maintained. The latter, which included a significant sculpture group in the style of João de Ruão, figured in the Count's bookplate, designed around 1900. Ayres de Campos famously used the complex to display his vast art collection and to house his library, both of which were among the most important in Portugal at the time.

== Public building ==
In 1928, the building was bought by the Ministry of Justice and repurposed as the city's courthouse, becoming known colloquially as Palácio da Justiça. As a result, further alterations were carried out in 1930. These works were based on a project by Manuel Abreu Castelo Branco, and supervised by the Directorate-General for National Buildings and Monuments. Around this time, the original portico was removed and reassembled in the Machado de Castro National Museum.

== See also ==
- João Maria Correia Ayres de Campos, 1st Count of Ameal
- Count of Ameal
- João Ameal
- João Correia Ayres de Campos
