= Count of Ameal =

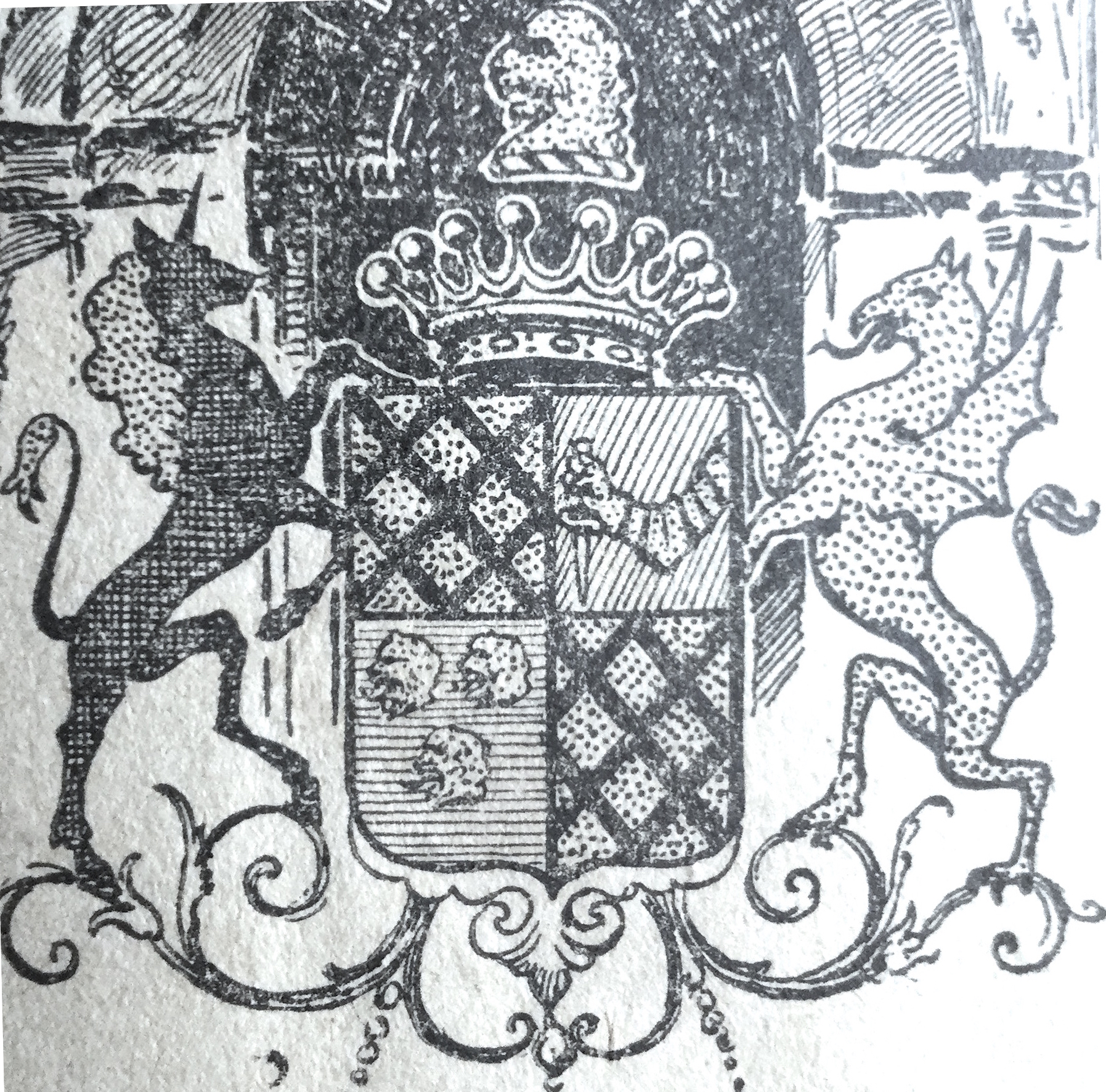
Arms of the Counts of Ameal, as depicted in João Maria Correia Ayres de Campos, 1st Count of Ameal's bookplate, circa 1900 (detail)

Count of Ameal (Portuguese: Conde do Ameal) is a Portuguese title of nobility held by the Ayres de Campos family (also graphed Aires de Campos in contemporary Portuguese orthography).

It was created on June 26, 1901, by Carlos I, king of Portugal, for João Maria Correia Ayres de Campos, 1st Count of Ameal (February 5, 1847 – June 13, 1920), a prominent political figure in Coimbra and a renowned maecenas, art collector and bibliophile. On the same date, Carlos I also created the subsidiary title Viscount of Ameal (Portuguese: Visconde do Ameal) for João's eldest son, who would succeed his father in the comital title upon the latter's death in 1920. Both titles were confirmed by king Manuel II in exile in 1920, and have since been associated.

The 2nd Count of Ameal, João de Sande Magalhães Mexia Ayres de Campos (May 11, 1877 - December 22, 1952), was a politician and diplomat, and a key participant in the failed republican Municipal Library Elevator Coup of 1908.

The 3rd Count, João Francisco de Barbosa Azevedo de Sande Ayres de Campos (February 23, 1902 – September 23, 1982), was a prolific author, a leading Portuguese representative of the Integralist school and a prominent ideologue of António de Oliveira Salazar's Estado Novo regime, having signed his works with the pseudonym João Ameal.

The countship takes its name from the small hamlet of Ameal, on the outskirts of Coimbra, where the first count's paternal ancestors had their family home - a small manor house dating back to the 18th century, which remains the family seat.

The former palace of the Counts of Ameal is a significant historic building in downtown Coimbra, and presently serves as the city's courthouse. Their mausoleum in Coimbra's Conchada cemetery, designed in the 1880s, is considered a masterpiece of Portuguese Gothic Revival architecture.

== See also ==
- João Maria Correia Ayres de Campos, 1st Count of Ameal
- João Ameal
- João Correia Ayres de Campos
- Palácio da Justiça (Coimbra)
