= Dragões (Portuguese Air Force) =

Dragons
- Dragões
- Portuguese Air Force roundel
- Active: 1956–1958; 1958–1961
- Country: Portugal
- Branch: Portuguese Air Force
- Role: Aerobatic display team
- Size: 4 Pilots
- Part of: 20th Squadron (1956–1958); 51st Squadron (1958–1961)
- Base: No 2 Air Base, Ota (1956–1958); No 5 Air Base, Monte Real (1958–1961)

Aircraft flown
- Fighter: F-84G Thunderjet (1956–1958); F-86 Sabre (1958–1961)

The Dragões (Portuguese for "dragons") was a flight demonstration team of the Portuguese Air Force that operated in the 1950s. It was created in 1956 as part of 20th Squadron, based at Ota Air Base and flew F-84 Thunderjet jet fighters until being deactivated in 1958. Later in the same year, it was reactivated as part of 51st Squadron, based at Monte Real Air Base and flying F-86 Sabre jet fighters, being definitely deactivated shortly after.

== See also ==
- Asas de Portugal
