= João Correia Ayres de Campos =

Portuguese lawyer, antiquarian, medievalist, and bibliophile

João Correia Ayres de Campos, GCC, (Lisbon, August 24, 1818 - Coimbra, March 24, 1885) was a Portuguese lawyer, antiquarian and medievalist, as well as a renowned bibliophile.

The son of Bento Correia Ayres de Campos (Coimbra, 1788-1872) and his wife Firmina Rita, João Ayres de Campos studied law at the University of Coimbra between 1836 and 1839. Founder and director of Coimbra’s Archaeological Institute, he authored several palaeographical studies of Portuguese manuscripts, including an Index Cronológico dos Pergaminhos e Forais Existentes no Arquivo da Câmara Municipal de Coimbra (1863) and an Índex e Sumários dos Livros e Documentos Mais Antigos e Importantes da Câmara Municipal de Coimbra (1869). He was part of the first generation of lay historians to have surveyed ancient manuscripts after the Portuguese dissolution of monasteries in the wake of the Liberal Monarchy in 1834.

In his capacity as director of Coimbra’s Archaeological Institute and head of its archaeological museum (the precursor of the Machado de Castro National Museum), he authored a Catálogo dos Objectos Existentes no Instituto de Arqueologia de Coimbra (1877), an Apontamentos Históricos de Coimbra (1872), and the survey Antiguidades Nacionais (1873), as well as several studies in local history.

In his own field of Law, he collaborated with the Gazeta dos Tribunais and with the Revista Jurídica de Coimbra. As a literary critic and commentator, he signed several articles in the publications Cosmorama Literário and Jornal da Sociedade Escolástica Filomática.

João Correia Ayres de Campos is famed for having assembled a significant private library, comprising a great number of manuscripts and rare books; his collection was lent continuity by his natural son and heir, the renowned art collector João Maria Correia Ayres de Campos, who would be created 1st Count of Ameal by king Carlos I of Portugal in 1901.

Coimbra's Rua Ayres de Campos (graphed Aires de Campos in contemporary Portuguese orthography) is named after him.

== See also ==
- João Maria Correia Ayres de Campos, 1st Count of Ameal
- Count of Ameal
- João Ameal
- Palácio da Justiça (Coimbra)
