= Count of Juncal =

Noble title in the Kingdom of Portugal

Count of Juncal (Portuguese: Conde do Juncal) is a Portuguese title of nobility. It was created on April 17, 1890, by Carlos I, king of Portugal, for Carlos Pinto Vieira da Mota (Paredes de Viadores, Marco de Canaveses, 1832 - Lisbon, March 18, 1906), a magistrate, long-time deputy to the Portuguese National Assembly and judge of Portugal's Supreme Court.

His niece and sole heir Maria Amélia de Sande Mexia Vieira da Mota married João Maria Correia Ayres de Campos, 1st Count of Ameal, in 1876, bringing the title into this family.
