= Ota Airport =

Airport in Ota, Portugal

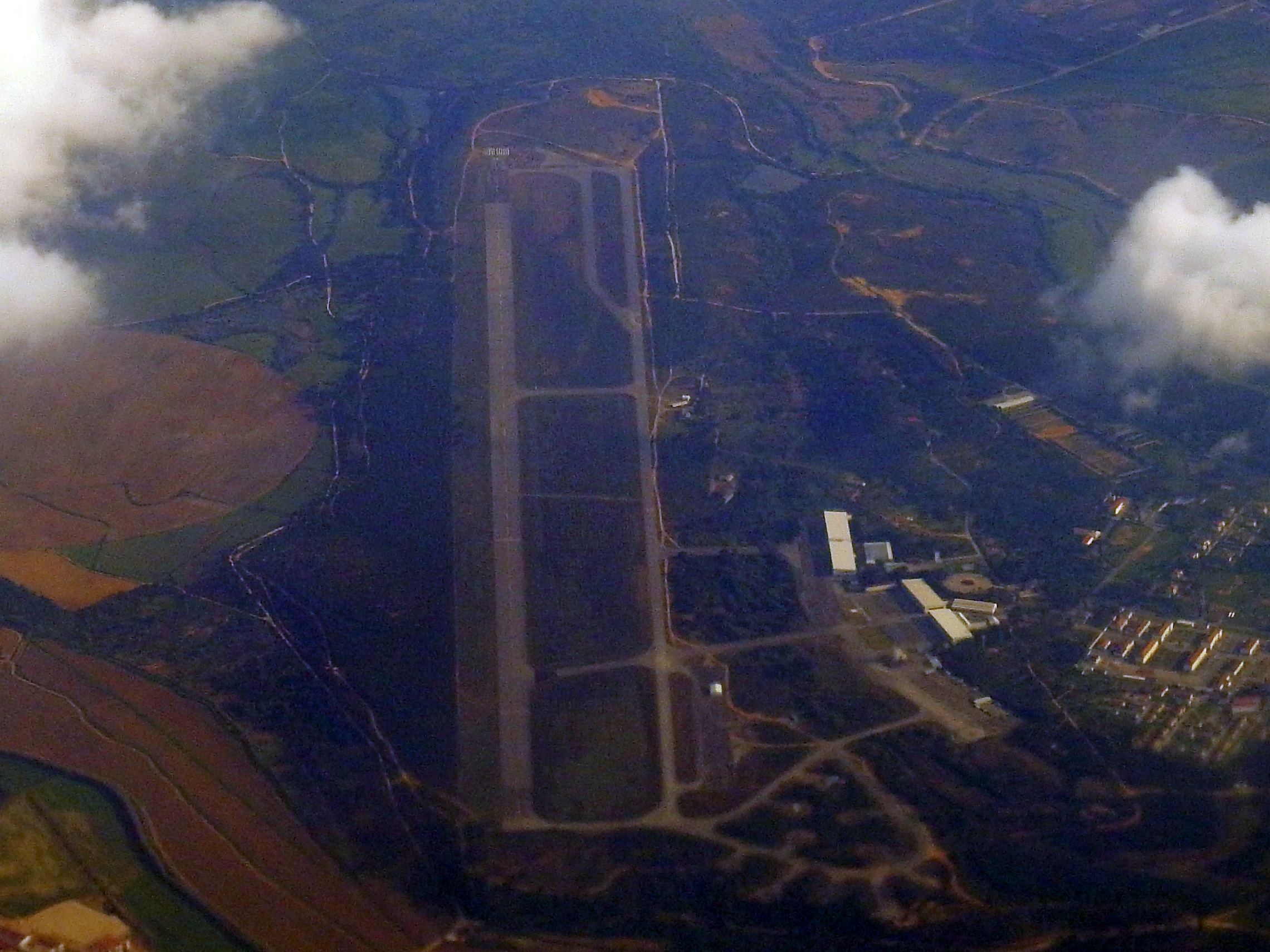
- Aerial view of the former Ota Air Base in April 2019
- IATA: none; ICAO: none

Summary
- Location: Ota, 50 km (27 nmi; 31 mi) north of Lisbon
- Opened: Not built
- Coordinates: 39°05′29″N 8°57′45″W
- Interactive map of Ota Airport
- Project on hold

Ota Airport was the planned site for the new Lisbon airport located in Ota, 50 km (27 nmi; 31 mi) north of Lisbon, the capital of Portugal. The project was discussed from the late 1990s until January 2008, when the project was aborted.

The area where the future airport was to be built is occupied by the former Ota Air Base of the Portuguese Air Force. The permanent air operations of this facility were discontinued, but it is still used as the Military and Technical Training Center of the Air Force (CFMTFA).

== History ==
The decision process has been qualified as a typical analysis paralysis. According to final governmental decision, the OTA location was turned down in favour of the Alcochete airport (now Lisbon Luís de Camões Airport), in an area used currently for Portuguese Air Force exercises. That location is closer to Lisbon centre and to the centre of mass of the Lisbon metropolitan area, with potential for future expansions.

The proposed Portuguese TGV high speed train would have a stop at Ota with connections to the rest of the country.

The decision process was controversial, with defenders of the various offers arguing with all sorts of facts and visions. Local lobbying is also strong. According to polls as at November 2007, public preference was clear for Alcochete (63%) vs Ota (15%).
