= Republic F-84 Thunderjet =

1946 fighter-bomber family

F-84 Thunderjet
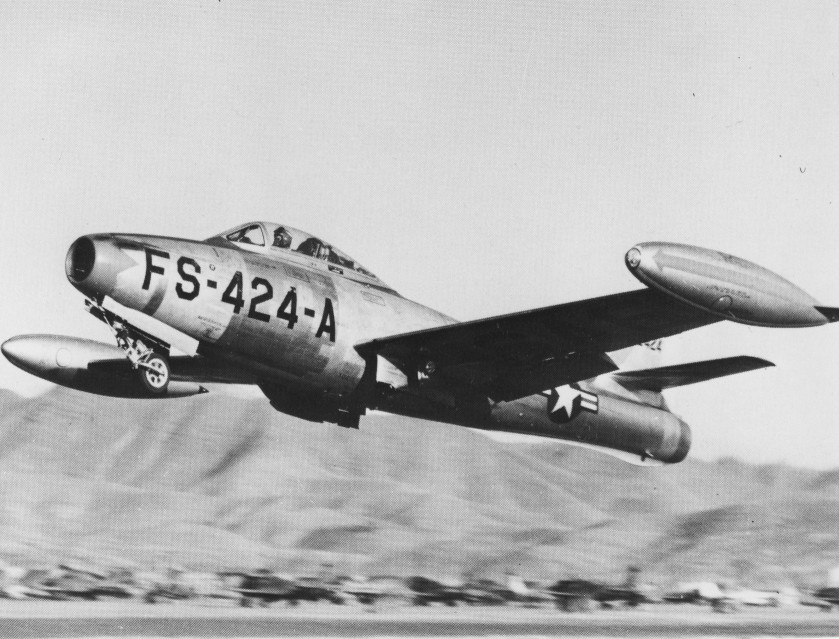
- USAF F-84E Thunderjet

General information
- Type: Fighter-bomber
- Manufacturer: Republic Aviation
- Primary user: United States Air Force
- Number built: 4,450

History
- Manufactured: 1946-1953
- Introduction date: November 1947
- First flight: 28 February 1946
- Retired: 1964 (USAF); 1974 (Yugoslavia)
- Developed into: Republic F-84F Thunderstreak; Republic XF-84H Thunderscreech; Republic XF-91 Thunderceptor

The Republic F-84 Thunderjet is an early turbojet fighter-bomber aircraft designed and produced by the American aircraft manufacturer Republic Aviation.

Originating as a 1944 United States Army Air Forces (USAAF) proposal for a "day fighter", Republic was selected to meet the requirement without a competition. On 28 February 1946, the F-84 performed its maiden flight. Although it entered service in 1947, the Thunderjet was plagued by such a large number of structural and engine problems that a 1948 United States Air Force (USAF) review declared it unable to execute any aspect of its intended mission and considered canceling the program. The F-84's issues brough financial hardship to Republic, which had to be paid early in order to keep both the company and the aircraft alive. A key reason for its rescue was that evaluators determined the F-84D's performance to be in excess of the rival Lockheed P-80 Shooting Star. The aircraft was not considered fully operational until the F-84D arrived in 1949 while the design only reached maturity with the definitive F-84G, which was introduced in 1951. In 1954, the straight-wing Thunderjet was joined by the swept-wing F-84F Thunderstreak fighter and RF-84F Thunderflash photo reconnaissance aircraft.

The Thunderjet became the USAF's primary strike aircraft during the Korean War, flying 86,408 sorties and destroying 60 percent of all ground targets in the conflict as well as eight Soviet-built MiG fighters. Many of the 4,450 F-84s produced served with NATO nations, and it was the first aircraft to fly with the USAF's Thunderbirds demonstration team. The Strategic Air Command operated the F-84 between 1948 and 1957. In the hands of the Força Aérea Portuguesa, it saw combat during the Angolan War of Independence. F-84s also conducted combat missions on multiple occasions, including the Second Taiwan Strait Crisis, when they were being flown by the Republic of China Air Force (ROCAF). It was the first production fighter aircraft to utilize inflight refueling as well as the first fighter to be capable of carrying a nuclear weapon, the Mark 7 nuclear bomb. Modified F-84s were used in several unusual projects, including the FICON and Tom-Tom dockings to the Boeing B-29 Superfortress and Convair B-36 Peacemaker bomber motherships, and the experimental turboprop-powered Republic XF-84H Thunderscreech.

The F-84 nomenclature can be somewhat confusing. The straight-wing F-84A to F-84E and F-84G models were called the Thunderjet. The F-84F Thunderstreak and RF-84F Thunderflash were different airplanes with swept wings. The XF-84H Thunderscreech (not its official name) was an experimental turboprop version of the F-84F. The F-84F swept wing version was intended to be a small variation of the normal Thunderjet with only a few different parts, so it kept the basic F-84 number. Production delays on the F-84F resulted in another order of the straight-wing version; this was the F-84G.

== Development ==
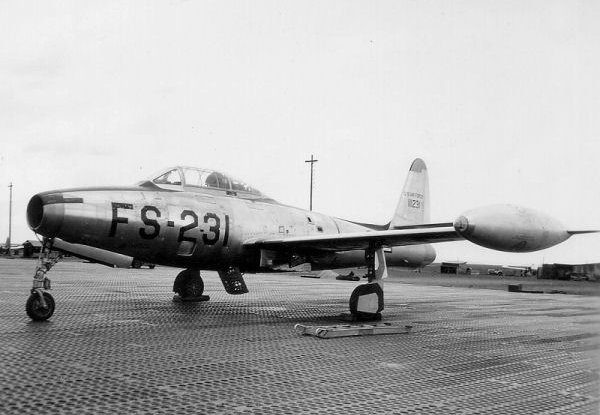
An F-84G at Chaumont-Semoutiers Air Base, France, in 1953

In 1944, Republic Aviation's chief designer, Alexander Kartveli, began working on a turbojet-powered replacement for the P-47 Thunderbolt piston-engined fighter aircraft. The initial attempts to redesign the P-47 to accommodate a jet engine proved futile due to the large cross-section of the Thunderbolt's fuselage. Instead, Kartveli and his team designed a new aircraft with a much-slimmer fuselage housing an axial compressor turbojet engine in the rear fuselage, and an air intake in the nose of the fuselage, with air ducts running from the nose to the engine and taking up much of the fuselage volume. Fuel was mainly stored in tanks in the thick, but laminar flow airfoil, unswept wings. The design process was supported by recently-obtained knowledge of aviation advances made in Nazi Germany during the Second World War.

On 11 September 1944, the United States Army Air Forces (USAAF) released General Operational Requirements for a day fighter with a top speed of 600 mph (520 kn; 970 km/h), a combat radius of 850 mi (740 nmi; 1,370 km), and armament of either eight .50 in (12.7 mm) or six .60 in (15.2 mm) machine guns. In addition, the new aircraft had to use the General Electric TG-180 axial turbojet which entered production as the Allison J35. These specifications proved to be too ambitious, however, and the radius requirement was reduced to 705 mi (613 nmi; 1,135 km) and the armament suite was reduced to six .50-caliber or four .60-caliber machine guns in order to reduce weight.

On 11 November 1944, Republic received an order for three prototypes of the new XP-84—known to Republic as the Model AP-23. Since the design promised superior performance to the Lockheed-built P-80 Shooting Star and Republic had extensive experience in building single-seat fighters, no competition was held for the contract. The name "Thunderjet" was chosen to continue the Republic Aviation tradition started with the P-47 Thunderbolt, while emphasizing the new method of propulsion. On 4 January 1945, even before the aircraft took to the air, the USAAF placed an additional order for 25 service test YP-84As and 75 production P-84Bs (later modified to 15 YP-84A and 85 P-84B).

Meanwhile, wind tunnel testing by the National Advisory Committee for Aeronautics revealed longitudinal instability and stabilizer skin buckling at high speeds. The weight of the aircraft, a great concern given the low thrust of early turbojets, was growing so quickly that the USAAF had to set a gross weight limit of 13,400 lb (6,100 kg). The results of this preliminary testing were incorporated into the third prototype, designated XP-84A, which was also fitted with a more powerful J35-GE-15 engine with 4,000 lbf (17.79 kN) of thrust.

The first prototype XP-84 was rolled out in December 1945, but availability of suitable engines delayed flight testing. The first prototype was transferred to Muroc Army Air Field (present-day Edwards Air Force Base) where it flew for the first time on 28 February 1946 with Major Wallace A. "Wally" Lien at the controls. It was joined by the second prototype in August, both aircraft flying with J35-GE-7 engines producing 3,750 lbf (16.68 kN). On 8 September 1946, the second XP-84 set a US national airspeed record of 607.2 mph (527.6 kn; 977.2 km/h), but failed to match the world speed record of 612.2 mph (532.0 kn; 985.2 km/h) set the day before by a British Gloster Meteor. The effort to break the speed record delayed the test program with the second prototype.

By October 1946, Republic had entered into financial hardship, allegedly only holding sufficient cash to continue trading for around three weeks, thus the company appealed to the USAAF to issue payments on the P-84 contract eight months prior to the delivery of the first production aircraft, which was authorised and thus allowed both Republic and the P-84 program to survive. The 15 YP-84As, which were delivered to Patterson Field (present-day Wright-Patterson Air Force Base) for service tests from January 1947, differed from XP-84s by having an upgraded J35-A-15 engine, carrying six 0.50 in M2 Browning machine guns (four in the nose and one in each wing root), and having the provision for wingtip fuel tanks.

Due to delays with delivery of jet engines and production of the XP-84A, the Thunderjet had undergone only limited flight testing by the time production P-84Bs began to roll out of the factory in 1947. Following the creation of the United States Air Force by the National Security Act of 1947, the "Pursuit" designation was replaced with "Fighter", and the P-84 became the F-84.

== Design ==
=== Overview ===
The Republic F-84 Thunderjet is a single-seat day fighter, featuring an all-metal wing and tricycle landing gear. Due to its lack of radar, it was typically limited to conducting daylight operations. While early-built aircraft required relatively lengthy take-off rolls before becoming airborne due to their low thrust-to-weight ratio, later-built F-84s were furnished with more powerful engines that largely rectified this. It was powered by a single Allison J35 turbojet engine, which was initially capable of producing up to 4,000 lbf (17.79 kN) of thrust.

Most of the aircraft produced were equipped with a straight wing that was equipped with wingtip fuel tanks that held up to 226 US gal (188 imp gal; 860 L) each. These tip tanks proved to be a particular issue for the aircraft during its operational service, largely due to a careless decision to not perform thorough studies of their impact on the aircraft's structure, as the wing design later proved to be incapable of safely supporting them and could result in structural failures of the wing by inducing excessive twisting during high-g maneuvers. To rectify this, small triangular fins were added to the outside of the tanks; a remedial modification programme was implemented covering all existing airframes.

The F-84D featured structural improvements that were built-in during the production process. Specific changes present from this model onwards include thicker aluminum skin being used to cover the wings and the use of a winterized fuel system that was capable of JP-4 fuel. The F-84D also saw the adoption of the more powerful J35-A-17D engine, capable of producing up to 5,000 lbf (22.24 kN). Another improvement to the original F-84 design was the adopt of rocket racks that folded flush with the wing after the 5 in (130 mm) High Velocity Aircraft Rockets (HVAR) were fired, which reduced drag over the older fixed mounting racks; this innovation was promptly adopted by other US jet fighter-bombers.

The F-84E was the first mode of the aircraft considered to be fully capable. It featured the J35-A-17 engine, further wing reinforcement, a 12 in (300 mm) fuselage extension in front of the wings and 3 in (76 mm) extension aft of the wings to enlarge both the cockpit and the avionics bay, an A-1B gunsight with AN/APG-30 fire-control radar, and provision for an additional pair of 230 US gal (190 imp gal; 870 L) fuel tanks to be carried on underwing pylons. The latter increased the combat radius from 850 mi (740 nmi; 1,370 km) to over 1,000 mi (870 nmi; 1,600 km).

The F-84G was the final model to be equipped with a straight wing. It introduced numerous changes and improvements, including a refueling boom receptacle in the left wing, autopilot, Instrument Landing System, J35-A-29 engine with 5,560 lbf (24.73 kN) of thrust, a distinctive framed canopy (which was also retrofitted to earlier models), and the ability to carry a single Mark 7 nuclear bomb.

=== Flight characteristics ===
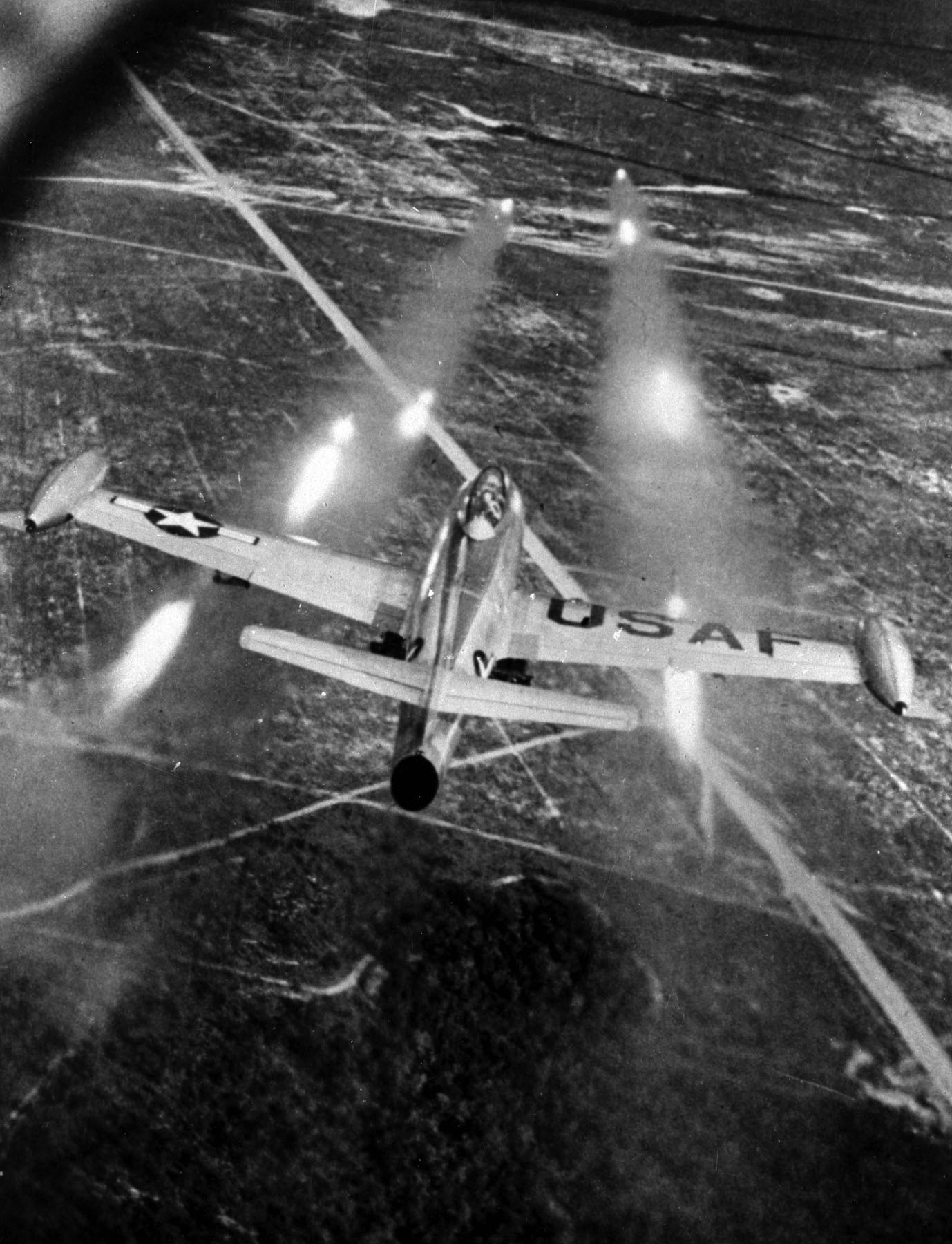
An F-84E launching rockets.

Typical of most early jets, the Thunderjet's takeoff performance left much to be desired. In hot Korean summers with a full combat load, the aircraft routinely required 10,000 ft (3,000 m) of runway for takeoff even with the help of RATO bottles (two or four of these were carried, each producing 1,000 lbf (4.4 kN) of thrust for 14 seconds). All but the lead aircraft had their visibility obscured by the thick smoke from the rockets. F-84s had to be pulled off the ground at 160 mph (140 kn, 260 km/h) with the control stick held all the way back. Landings were made at a similar speed. For comparison, the North American P-51 Mustang landed at approximately 120 mph (100 kn, 190 km/h). Despite the "hot" landing speeds, the Thunderjet was easy to fly on instruments and crosswinds did not present much of a problem.

Largely due to the thick straight wing fitted to the Thunderjet, it rapidly reached its Mach 0.82 limitation at full throttle and low altitude. The aircraft had sufficient power to fly faster, but exceeding the Mach limit at low altitudes resulted in a violent pitch-up and structural failure, causing the wings to break off. Above 15,000 ft (4,600 m), the F-84 could be flown faster but at the expense of severe buffeting. However, the airspeed was sufficiently easy to control to make safe dive bombing from 10,000 ft possible.

This top speed limitation proved troublesome against Soviet Mikoyan-Gurevich MiG-15s in Korea. Slower than the MiG, the F-84 was also unable to turn tightly with a maximum instantaneous-turn load of only 3 g followed by rapid loss of airspeed. One F-84E pilot credited with two MiG kills achieved his second victory by intentionally flying his aircraft into pitch-up. The MiGs chasing him were unable to follow the violent maneuver and one crashed into the ground. Luckily for the F-84E pilot, the aircraft did not disintegrate, but the airframe did suffer heavy warping.

The F-84 proved to be a stable gun platform; its computing gunsight aided in accurate gunnery and bombing. Pilots commonly praised the aircraft for possessing Republic's legendary ruggedness.

Pilots nicknamed the Thunderjet "The Lead Sled". It was also called "The Iron Crowbar", "a hole sucking air", "The Hog" ("The Groundhog"), and "The World's Fastest Tricycle", "Ground Loving Whore" as a testament to its long takeoff rolls. F-84 lore stated that all aircraft were equipped with a "sniffer" device that, upon passing takeoff safety speed, would look for the dirt at the end of the runway. As soon as the device could smell the dirt, the controls would turn on and let the pilot fly off the ground. In the same vein, it was suggested a bag of dirt should be carried in the front landing gear well. Upon reaching takeoff safety speed, the pilot would dump the dirt under the wheels, fooling the sniffer device.

== Operational history ==
=== Introduction ===
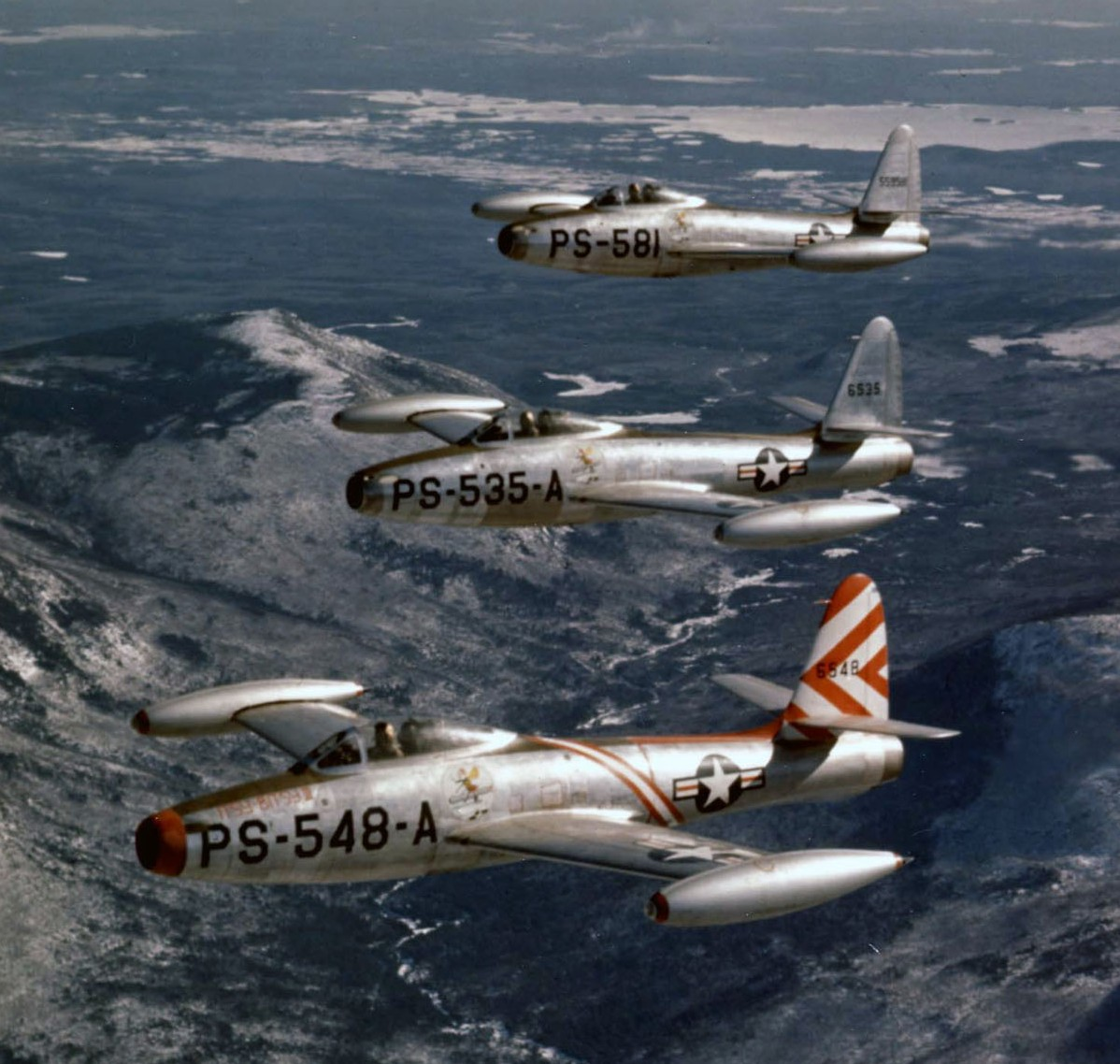
P-84Bs of the 48th Fighter Squadron, 14th Fighter Group, 1948

The F-84B, which differed from the YP-84A only in having faster-firing M3 machine guns (later F-84s also had provision to carry eight 5 in (130 mm) High Velocity Aircraft Rockets (HVAR) underwing), became operational with 14th Fighter Group at Dow Field, Bangor, Maine, in December 1947. Flight restrictions followed immediately, limiting maximum speed to Mach 0.8 due to control reversal, and limiting maximum acceleration to 5.5 g-force (54 m/s^{2}) due to wrinkling of the fuselage skin. To compound the problem, parts shortages and maintenance difficulties earned the aircraft the nickname, "Mechanic's Nightmare". On 24 May 1948, the entire F-84B fleet was grounded due to structural failures in the aircraft's wings. The F-84C featured a somewhat more reliable J35-A-13C engine of the same power as the A-15-C used by the F-84B, and modified fuel and electrical systems. Beyond these modifications, the F-84C was virtually identical to the F-84B, and suffered from the same defects.

A 1948 review of the F-84 program discovered that none of the F-84B or F-84C aircraft could be considered operational or capable of executing any aspect of their intended mission. The program was saved from cancellation because the F-84D, whose production was well underway, had satisfactorily addressed the major faults identified. A fly-off against the F-80 revealed that while the Shooting Star had a shorter takeoff roll, better low altitude climb rate and superior maneuverability, the F-84 could carry a greater bomb load, was faster, had better high altitude performance and greater range. As a compromise, the USAF in 1949 committed US$8 million to implement over 100 upgrades to all F-84Bs and F-84Cs, most notably reinforcing the wings to a similar standard to the F-84D. Despite the resultant improvements, both the F-84B and F-84C were withdrawn from service during 1952.

The considerably improved F-84D entered USAF service in 1949. Only three years later, this model was phased out by the USAF, although it continued to be flown by the Air National Guard (ANG) up until 1957. The more effective F-84E entered USAF service in 1950. Despite various improvements made to the aircraft, the in-service rates for the F-84E remained poor with only half of the aircraft being operational in April 1950. This was primarily due to a severe shortage of spares for the Allison engines. The expectation was that F-84Es would fly 25 hours per month, accumulating 100 hours between engine overhauls. The actual flight hours for Korean War and NATO deployments rapidly outpaced the supply and Allison's ability to manufacture new engines. The F-84E was withdrawn from USAF service in 1956, serving with the Air Force Reserve until 1957 and lingering with ANG units until 1959.

The final straight-wing F-84 was the F-84G, intended as a stop-gap until the swept wing F-84F entered service, but ordered in large numbers to build-up NATO air forces. The F-84G entered service in 1951, although deliveries were slowed by shortages of engines. Production continued until July 1953 with 3,025 F-84Gs delivered, with 789 aircraft going to the USAF and 2,236 to US allies as part of US military aid. The F-84G was retired from the USAF in mid-1960.

=== Korean War ===
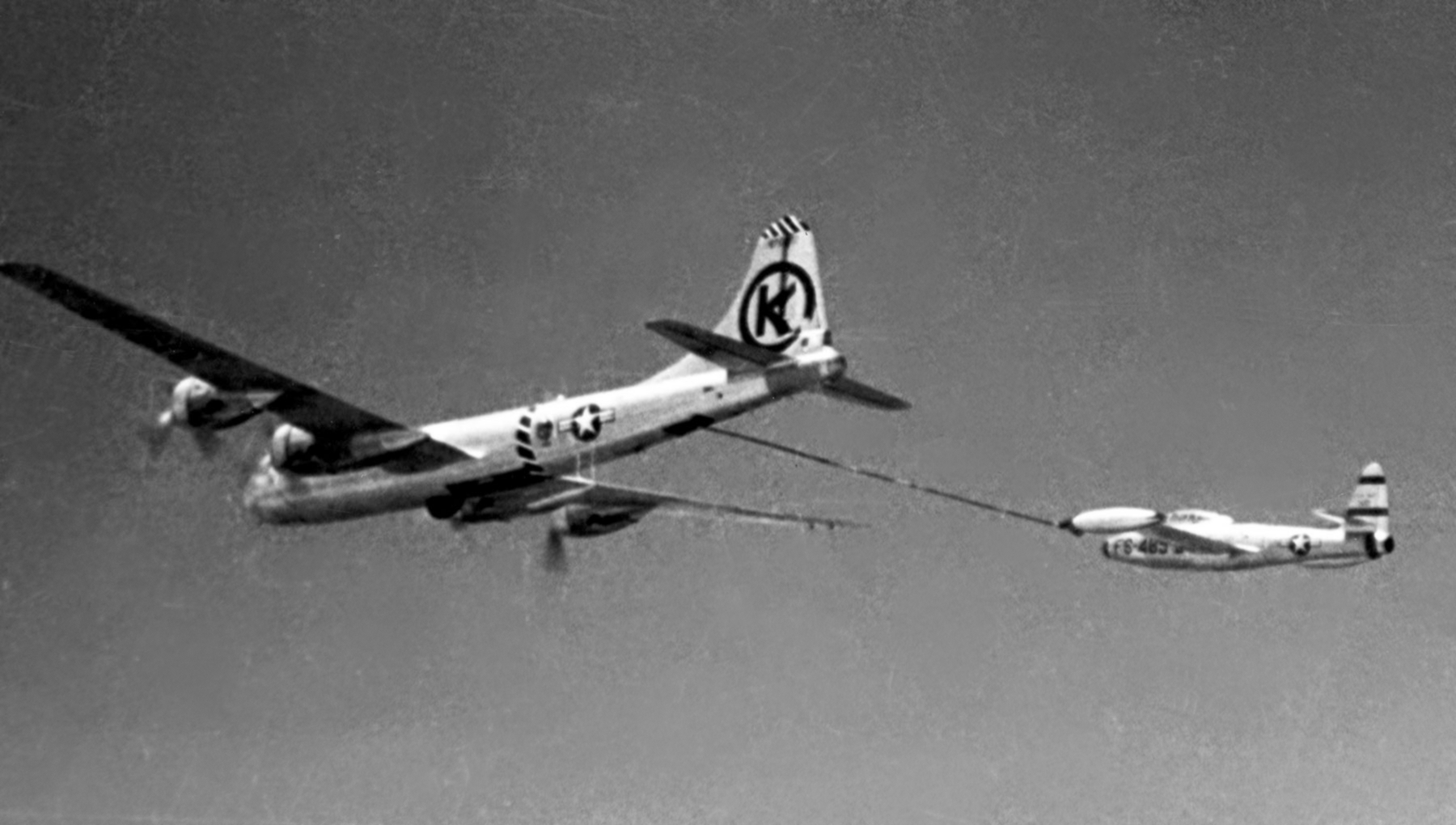
A KB-29M tanker refueling an F-84E over Korea. F-84Es could only refuel the wingtip tanks separately.

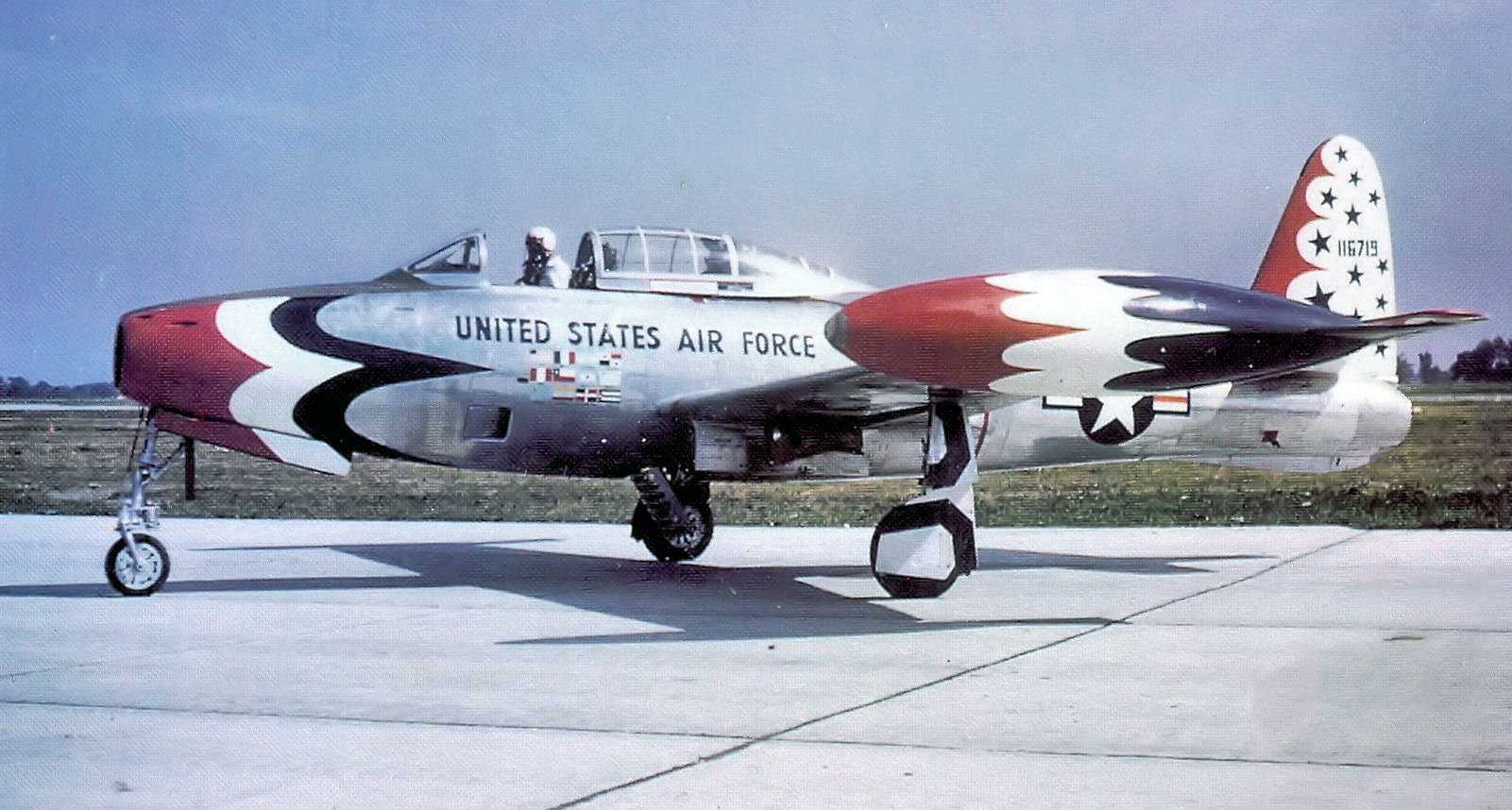
F-84G-26-RE Thunderjet 51-16719 while assigned to the 3600th Air Demonstration Team (USAF Thunderbirds), 1954.

The Thunderjet had a distinguished record during the Korean War. After the entry of the People's Republic of China into the war in October 1950, the US Fifth Air Force requested that a wing of F-84s be sent to Korea. While the F-84B and F-84C could not be deployed overseas because their J35 engines had a service life of only 40 hours, the F-84D and F-84E were more suitable, and so the F-84E-equipped 27th Fighter Escort Group was sent to the Far East aboard the aircraft carrier Bataan, which arrived in Japan on 30 November 1950. After maintenance, the F-84s moved to Taegu airfield (known as K-2), flying its first operational missions on 7 December 1950. The aircraft were initially tasked with escorting the B-29 Superfortress bombers. The first Thunderjet air-to-air victory was scored on 21 January 1951 at the cost of two F-84s. The F-84 was outmatched by the swept-wing Soviet Mikoyan-Gurevich MiG-15, which was both faster and more manoeuvrable, and the MiG counter-air mission was soon given to the F-86 Sabre. Accordingly, the F-84 switched to the ground attack role at which it excelled.

The number of units operating the F-84 over Korea gradually increased, both by bringing over Air National Guard Groups from the US, and converting F-80 squadrons already in theater. The F-84 flew a total of 86,408 missions, dropping 55,586 tons (50,427 metric tons) of bombs, 6,129 tons (5,560 metric tons) of napalm, and firing 22,154 rockets. The USAF claimed F-84s were responsible for 60 percent of all ground targets destroyed in the war. Notable F-84 operations included the 1952 attack on the Sui-ho Dam. During the conflict, the F-84 became the first USAF fighter to utilize aerial refueling. In aerial combat, F-84 pilots were credited with eight MiG-15 kills against a Soviet-claimed loss of 64 aircraft. The total losses were 335 F-84D, E and G models. According to the USAF FY1953 statistical digest, during the Korean war, 305 F-84s were lost, including 249 in combat missions and 56 non-combat losses.

=== USAF service in Western Europe ===
A notable incident occurred on 10 March 1953, when two Czech MiG-15 fighters intercepted two USAF F-84Es that were claimed to have strayed from German to Czechoslovak airspace and shot one down. It crashed on the German side of the border and the pilot successfully ejected.

=== Portugal ===
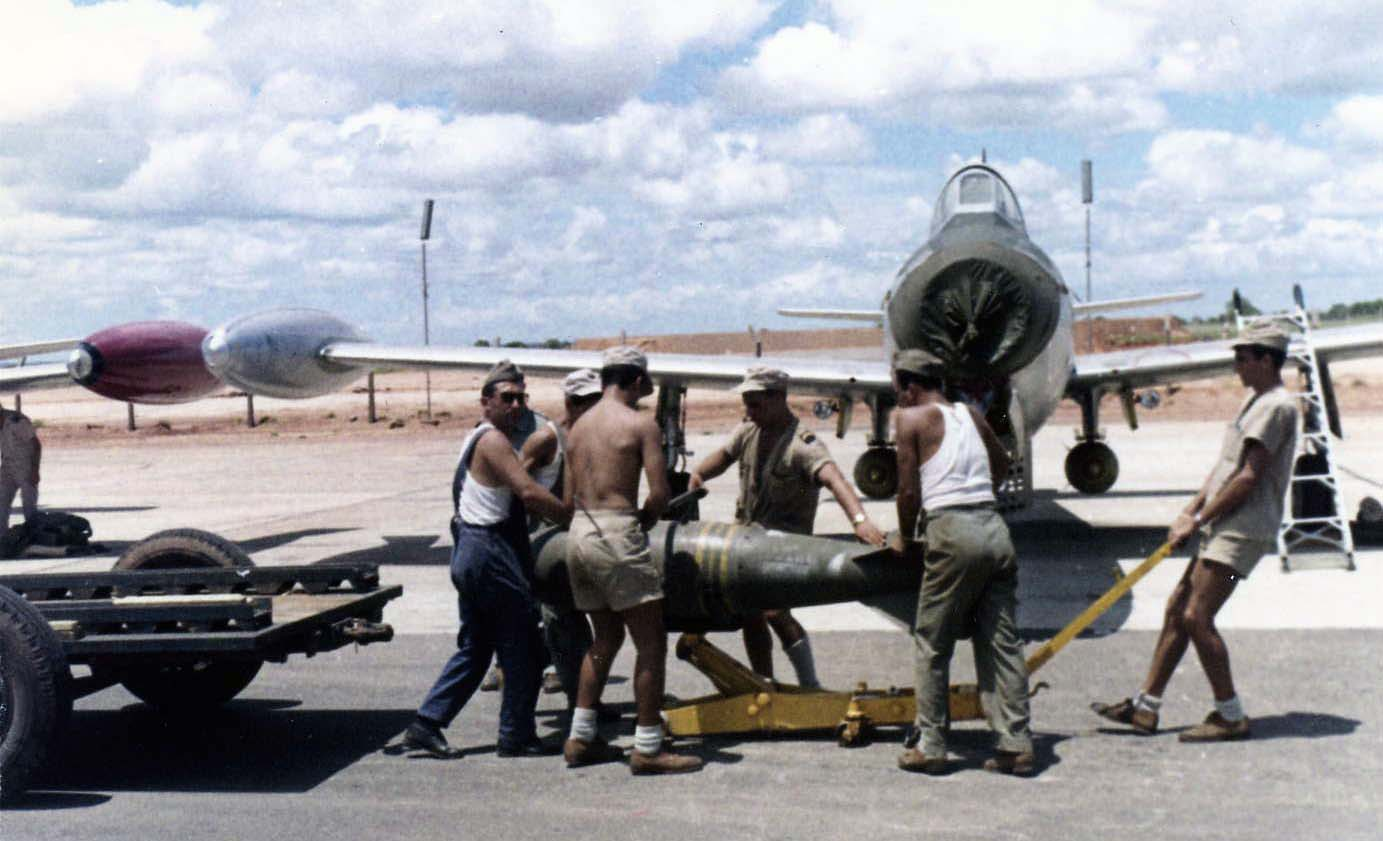
A Portuguese F-84 being loaded with ordnance in the 1960s at Luanda Air Base during the Portuguese Colonial War.

Portugal received its first F-84s in January 1953, with 25 new build F-84Gs later supplemented by USAFE stocks and from other European operators, with deliveries eventually reaching 125 F-84Gs. They were the Força Aérea Portuguesa's first operational jet fighters. Two squadrons were formed in Portugal, operating the F-84 in both air-defense and ground attack roles, with the Thunderjet also equipping an aerobatic display team, the Dragões. In 1960, the two operational F-84 squadrons were disbanded and the remaining F-84s transferred to training units.

In 1961, however, an uprising against Portuguese rule began in Angola, and as a result, 25 F-84Gs were refurbished by OGMA and sent to Angola, with the first aircraft arriving at Luanda in August that year. There, they formed the Esquadra 91 (91st Squadron), carrying out bomb, rocket and gun attacks against separatist forces. In 1966, after Rhodesia's Unilateral Declaration of Independence, and the imposition of the Beira Patrol by the British Royal Navy to attempt to stop the flow of fuel to Rhodesia via the port of Beira, Mozambique, a detachment of eight F-84s was sent from Luanda to Mozambique to guard against potential clashes with British forces, with the aircraft returning to Angola when the threat of military action receded. Attrition of the F-84s was heavy, and by 1973, only five F-84s remained operational, with the last examples withdrawn from use that year, although the F-84G nominally remained in Portuguese service until October 1975.

=== Republic of China ===
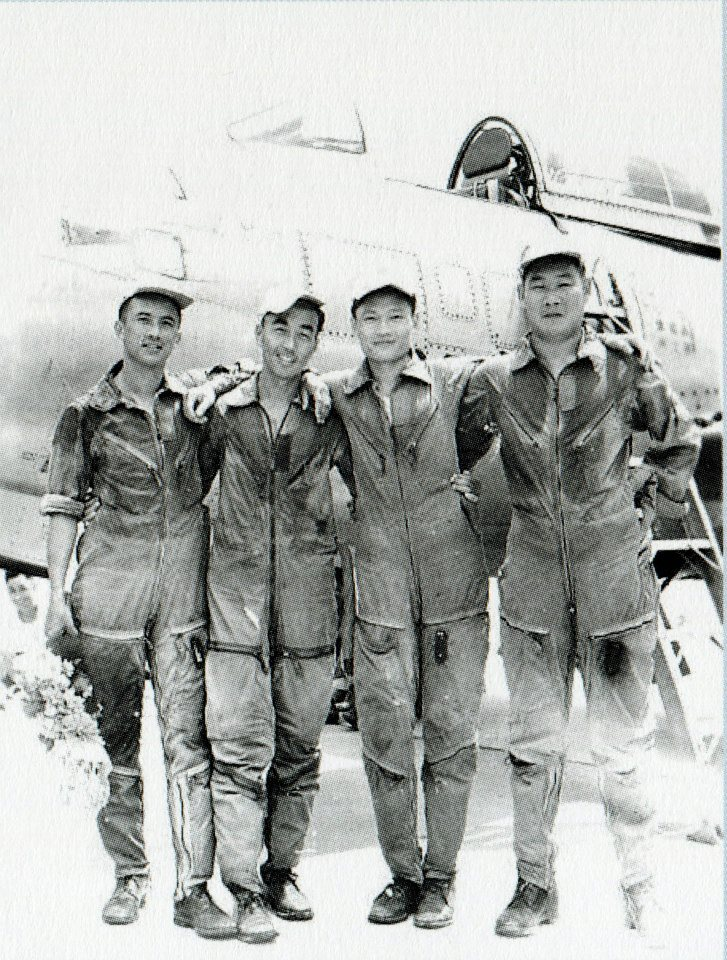
Pilots of the ROCAF 4th Squadron at Chiayi Air Base following the "21 July Matsu Air Battle" in 1956. From left to right: Lieut. Ouyang Yi-Fen, Capt. Tsai Yun-Hui, Lieut. Yu Chu, and Maj. Niu Hsun. During the mission, Lieutenant Ouyang single-handedly shot down two MiG-17 fighters and damaged two others, securing a major aerial victory for the Republic of China Air Force.

The Republic of China Air Force (ROCAF) began operating surplus F-84G Thunderjets acquired from the USAF in 1953, with the aircraft serving in both ground-attack and interceptor roles amid rising tensions across the Taiwan Strait. Following their introduction, F-84G Thunderjets were primarily employed for low-level strafing missions against People's Liberation Army (PLA) ground and maritime targets along the Chinese coastline. Meanwhile, RF-84 variants were tasked with tactical reconnaissance operations, gathering intelligence on coastal regions of mainland China.

On 21 July 1956, four ROCAF F-84Gs from the 4th Squadron, based at Chiayi Air Base, undertook an escort mission over the Matsu Islands to protect an RF-84 reconnaissance aircraft. The formation was led by Major Niu Hsun (Chinese: 牛迅), and included Lieutenant Yu Chu (Chinese: 于礎) as No. 2, Captain Tsai Yun-Hui (Chinese: 蔡雲輝) as No. 3, and Lieutenant Ouyang Yi-Fen (Chinese: 歐陽漪棻) as No. 4 aircraft. During the mission, the formation encountered MiG-17 fighters from the 45th Regiment, 15th Division of the People's Liberation Army Air Force (PLAAF). In the ensuing engagement, Lieutenant Ouyang Yi-Fen distinguished himself by shooting down two MiG-17s—one piloted by Song Yi-Chun (Chinese: 宋义春) and the other by Liu Ye-Chen (Chinese: 刘叶臣)—and damaging two additional MiG-17s. PLAAF records later confirmed that both enemy pilots were killed in action. None of the five ROCAF Thunderjets, include the RF-84 reconnaissance aircraft, were lost or damaged. The engagement, later known as the "21 July Matsu Air Battle," was regarded as a major aerial victory for the ROCAF, showcasing the effective use of the F-84G when operated with tactical flexibility and strong leadership.

F-84G units remained active during the Second Taiwan Strait Crisis in 1958, engaging PLA MiG-15 and MiG-17 fighters in a series of aerial skirmishes. Although both sides sustained losses, the F-84G continued to play a vital role until late 1958, when it was gradually replaced by the more advanced F-100 Super Sabre.

=== Notable achievements ===
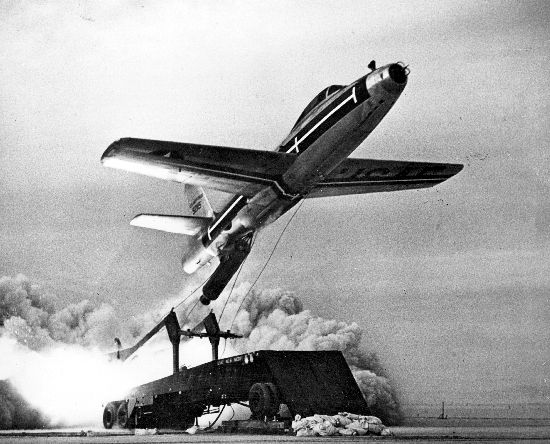
An F-84 during zero-length launch testing.

- The F-84 was the first aircraft flown by the USAF's Thunderbirds display team, which operated F-84G Thunderjets from 1953 to 1955 and F-84F Thunderstreaks from 1955 to 1956. The F-84E was also flown by the Skyblazers team of United States Air Forces Europe (USAFE).
- On 7 September 1946, the second XP-84 prototype set a national speed record of 607.2 mph (527.6 kn, 977.2 km/h), slightly slower than the world record 612.2 mph (532.0 kn, 985.2 km/h) held by the British Gloster Meteor. None of these records exceeded the April 1941 wartime achievement of an Me 163A rocket plane at some 624.2 mph; itself first exceeded by the American Douglas D-558-1 Skystreak in August 1947, using basically the same Allison J35 turbojet engine as the F-84.
- On 22 September 1950, two EF-84Es, flown by David C. Schilling and Col. William Ritchie, refuelled using the probe and drogue system from Avro Lincoln tankers operated by the British company Flight Refuelling Limited, flew across the North Atlantic from Great Britain to the United States. Ritchie's aircraft ran out of fuel over Newfoundland, but the other successfully made the crossing, which took 10 hours and 2 minutes and three aerial refuelings. The flight demonstrated that large numbers of fighters could be rapidly moved across the Atlantic.
- The F-84G was the first fighter with built-in aerial refueling capability and the first single-seat aircraft capable of carrying a nuclear bomb.
- On 20 August 1953, 17 F-84Gs of the 508th Strategic Fighter Wing using aerial refueling flew from the United States to the United Kingdom. The 4,485 mi (3,897 nmi; 7,218 km) journey was the longest-ever nonstop flight by jet fighters at the time.
- In 1955, an F-84G became the first aircraft to be zero-length launched from a trailer.

=== Costs ===
Costs, US$	F-84B	F-84C	F-84D	F-84E	F-84G	F-84F	RF-84F
Airframe			139,863	139,863	150,846	562,715	482,821
Engine			41,654	41,654	41,488	146,027	95,320
Electronics			7,165	7,165	4,761	9,623	21,576
Armament			23,559	23,559	37,433	41,713	63,632
Ordnance					2,719	9,252	4,529
Flyaway cost	286,407 (Note: For the first 100 aircraft.); 163,994 (Note: For the next 141 aircraft.)	147,699	212,241	212,241	237,247	769,300	667,608
Cost per flying hour						390	
Maintenance cost per flying hour						185	185

Notes: The costs are 1950 estimates and have not been adjusted for inflation.

== Variants ==
=== Straight-wing variants ===
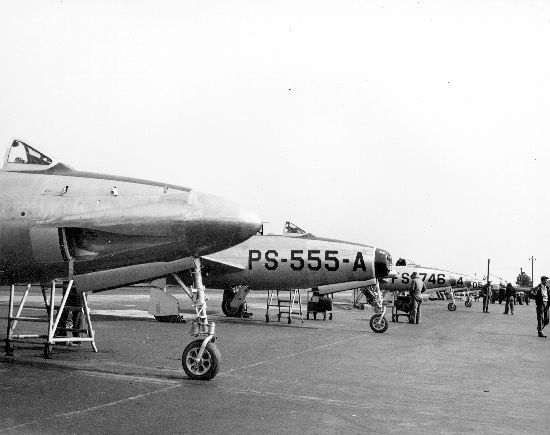
The XP-84A (foreground) and YP-84As

XP-84
The first two prototypes. Powered by 3,750 lbf (16.7 kN) J-35-GE-7 engine, and armed with four .50 in (12.7mm) machine guns.
XP-84A
The third prototype with a more powerful (4,000 lbf (18 kN)) J35-GE-15 engine. This airframe was subsequently modified with a pointed fairing over the intake and lateral NACA intakes were installed into the intake trunks.
YP-84A
Service test aircraft with J35-A-15 engines and six guns; 15 built.
P-84B (F-84B)
First production version, J35-A-15 engine; 226 built.
F-84C
Reverted to the more reliable J35-A-13 engine, improved fuel, hydraulic and electrical systems; 191 built.
F-84D
J35-A-17 engine, various structural improvements. The pitot tube was moved from the tail fin to the splitter in the air intake with fins added to the wingtip fuel tanks; 154 built.

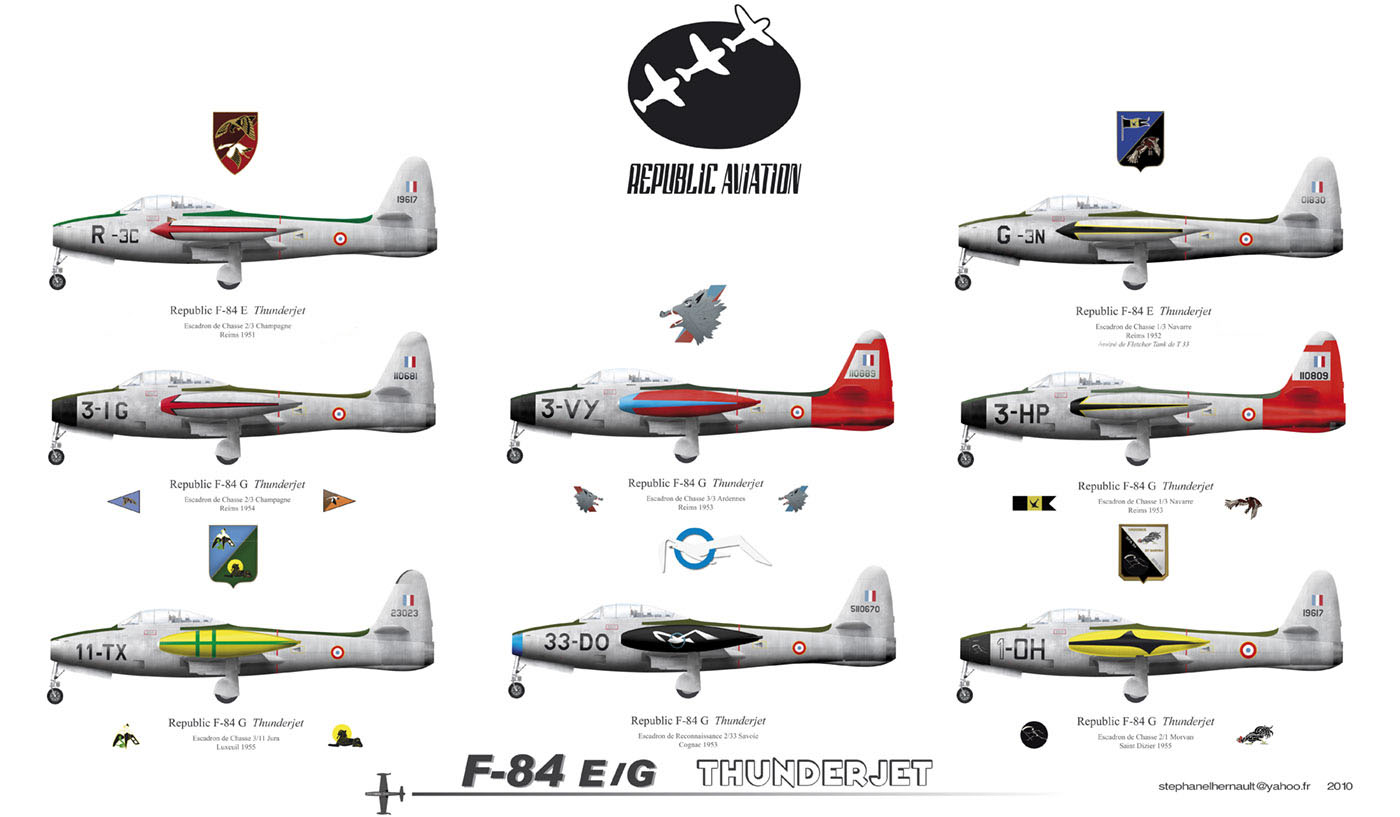
F84 E&G Thunderjet French Air Force 1951–1955

EF-84D
Two F-84Ds, EF-84D 48-641 and EF-84D 48-661 were modified with wing-tip coupling devices to allow them to link in-flight with the wingtips of a B-29 bomber and extend the range of the fighters. The B-29 and one of the EF-84s were lost in an accident on 24 April 1953, when the F-84s automatic flight controls were activated after link-up.
F-84E
J35-A-17D engine, Sperry AN/APG-30 fire-control radar, retractable attachments for RATO bottles, inboard wing hardpoints made "wet" to permit carrying an additional pair of 230 US gal (190 imp gal; 870 L). Stretched fuselage and enlarged cockpit. Most aircraft were retrofitted with F-84G-style reinforced canopies. 843 built. Some aircraft used as interim reconnaissance aircraft, with cameras in the wingtip fuel tanks, by Netherlands and Norway until RF-84Fs became available.
EF-84E
F-84Es modified for testing - examples included testing of air-to-air refuelling systems, use as a FICON test aircraft with a B-36 host and use as test aircraft for the ZELMAL (Zero-length launch, Mat landing) experiments for operations away from airfields vulnerable to nuclear attack using the booster rocket from the MGM-1 Matador cruise missile.
F-84G
Single-seat fighter-bomber capable of delivering the Mark 7 nuclear bomb using the LABS, J35-A-29 engine, autopilot, capable of inflight refuelling using both the boom (receptacle in left wing leading edge) and drogue (probe fitted to wingtip fuel tanks), introduced the multi-framed canopy which was later retrofitted to earlier straight-winged F-84s. A total of 3,025 were built (789 for the USAF for other users under MAP). Some used by Belgium, Denmark, France, Italy and Yugoslavia as interim reconnaissance aircraft with cameras in the wingtip fuel tanks.
F-84KX
Conversion of ex-USAF F-84Bs into target drones for the United States Navy. Sometimes claimed that 80 aircraft converted but program may have been cancelled prior to conversion or use of the aircraft.
Tip-Tow
See EF-84D above, did not become operational. See FICON project
Tom-Tom
Two RF-84K and B-36 wingtip coupling experiment, did not become operational. See FICON project
FICON
F-84E and GRB-36D trapeze system, became operational. See FICON project
B.Kh.16
(Thai: บ.ข.๑๖) Royal Thai Air Force designation for the F-84G.

=== Swept-wing variants ===
YF-96A aka YF-84F aka YRF-84K
F-84E 49-2430 converted to swept wing configuration, and powered by J35-A35. The "first prototype" for the F-84F Thunderstreak.
YF-84F
Modified prototypes with Wright J65 engine and deeper fuselage. Two built.
F-84F Thunderstreak
Production version with swept wing and J65 engine.
RF-84F Thunderflash
Reconnaissance version of the F-84F, 715 built.
RF-84K FICON project
Reconnaissance version of the F model, 25 built to hang from the Consolidated B-36 Peacemaker.
XF-84H Thunderscreech
Experimental supersonic-turboprop version.
YF-84J
Two conversions with the General Electric J73 engine.

== Operators ==
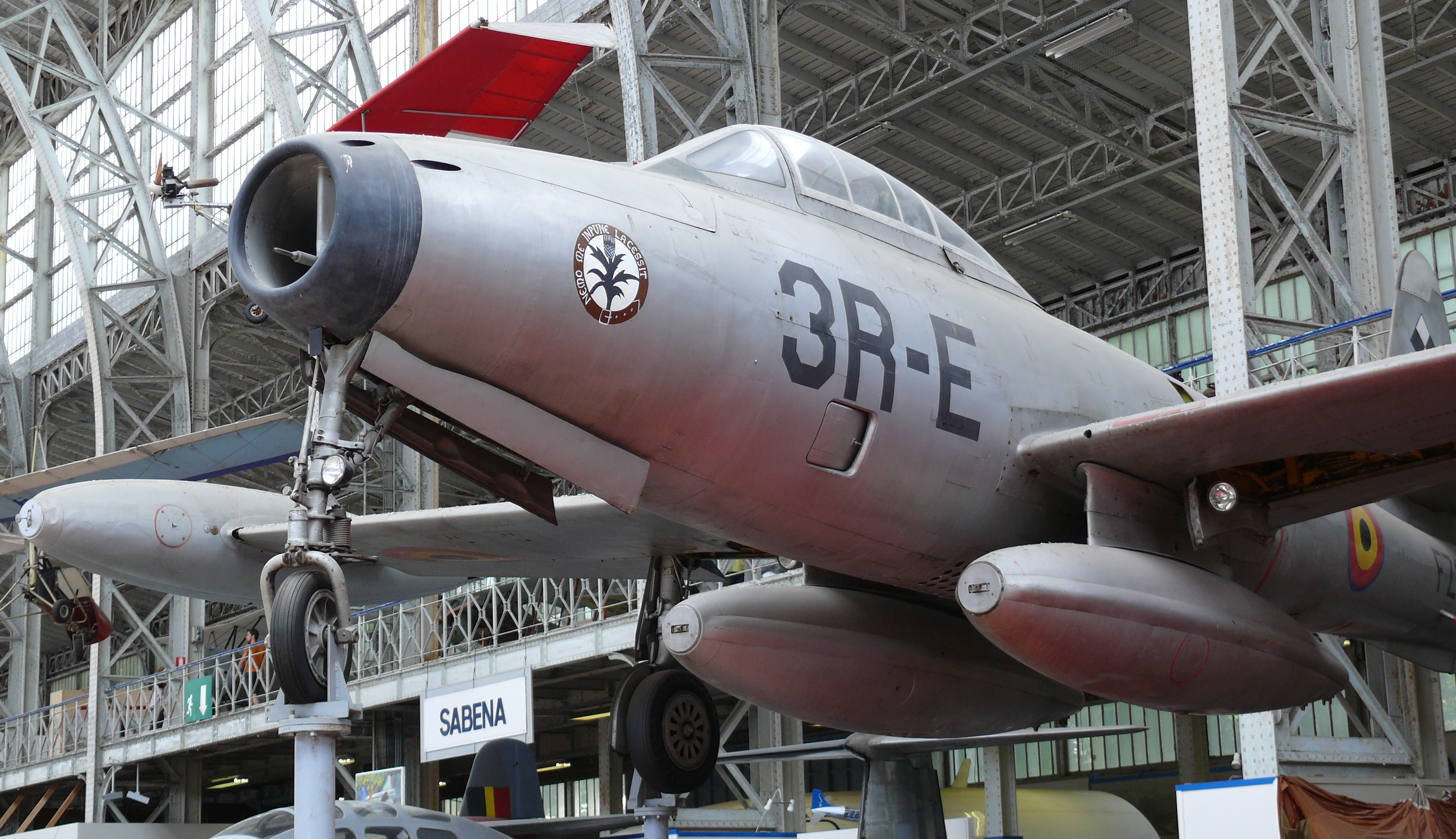
F-84 Thunderjet in the Royal Military Museum at the Jubelpark, Brussels.

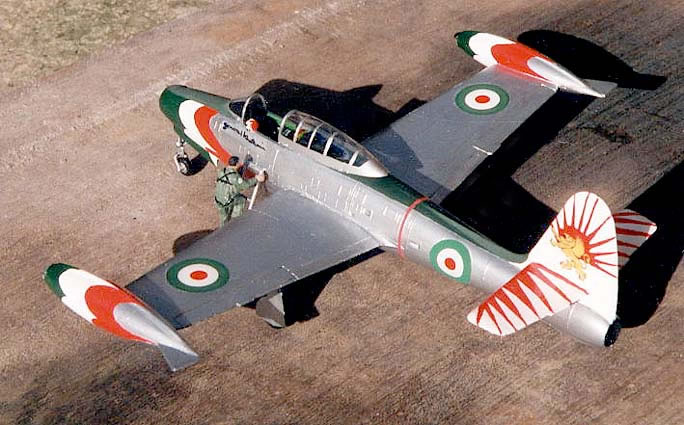
Imperial Iranian Air Force F-84G of the Golden Crown aerobatic team.

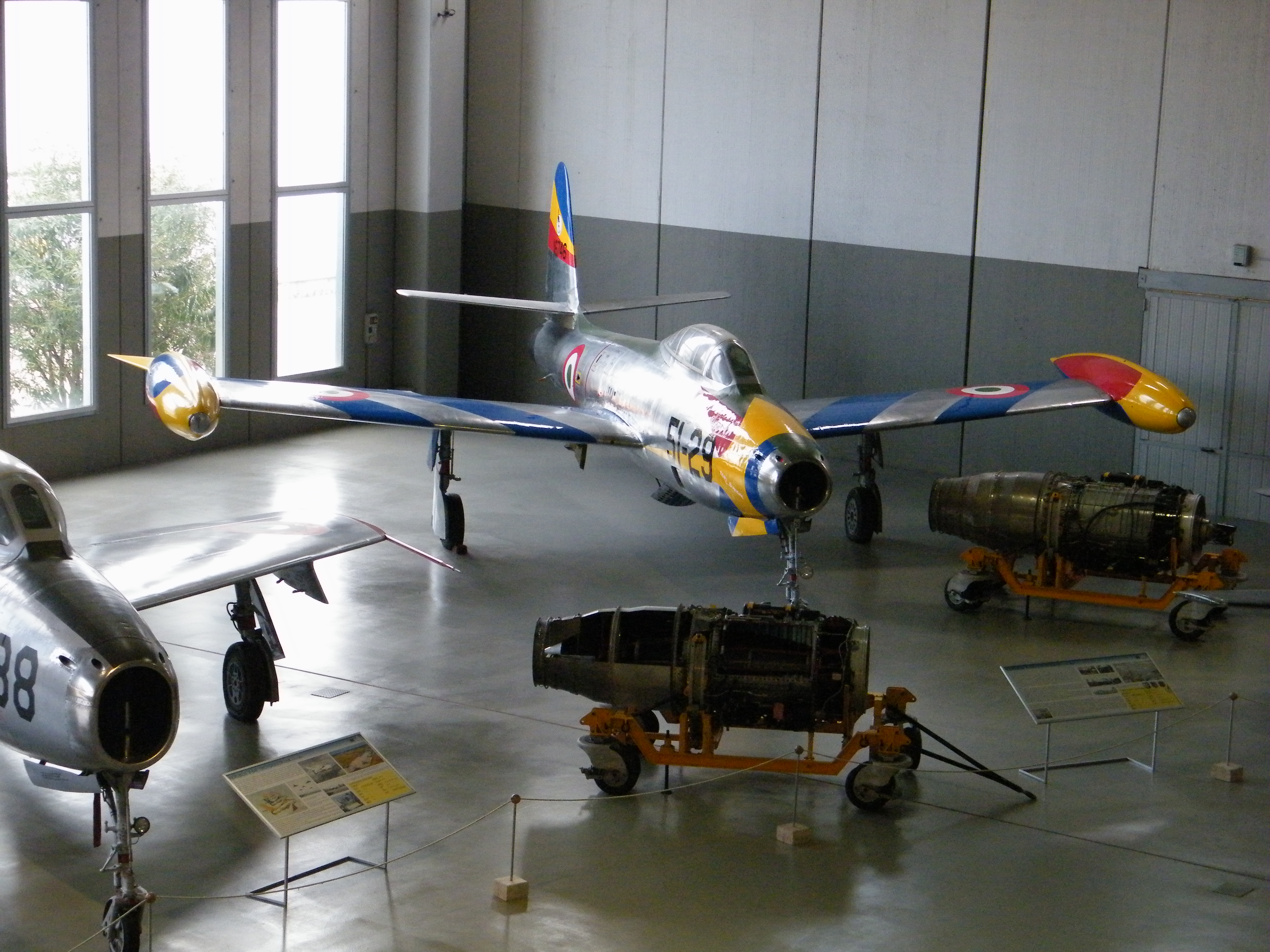
F-84 Thunderjet at the Italian Air Force Museum, Vigna di Valle in 2012.

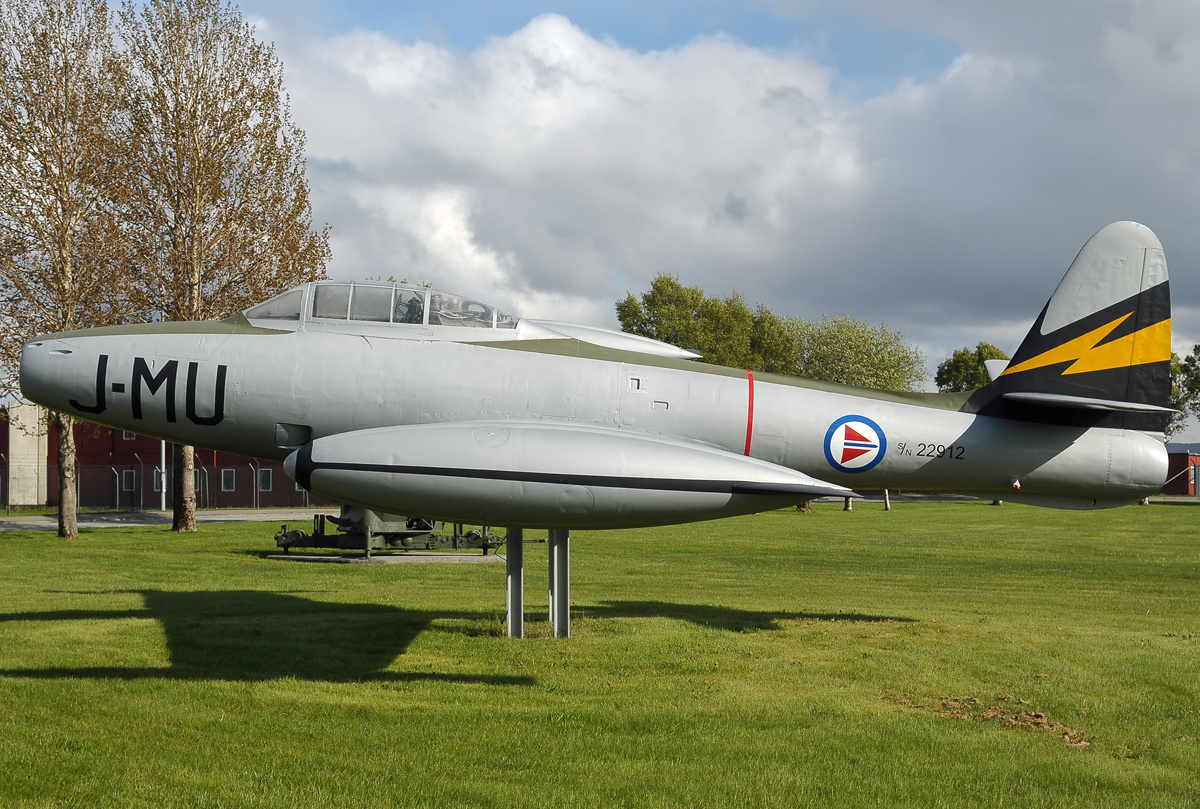
Royal Norwegian Air Force F-84G Thunderjet.

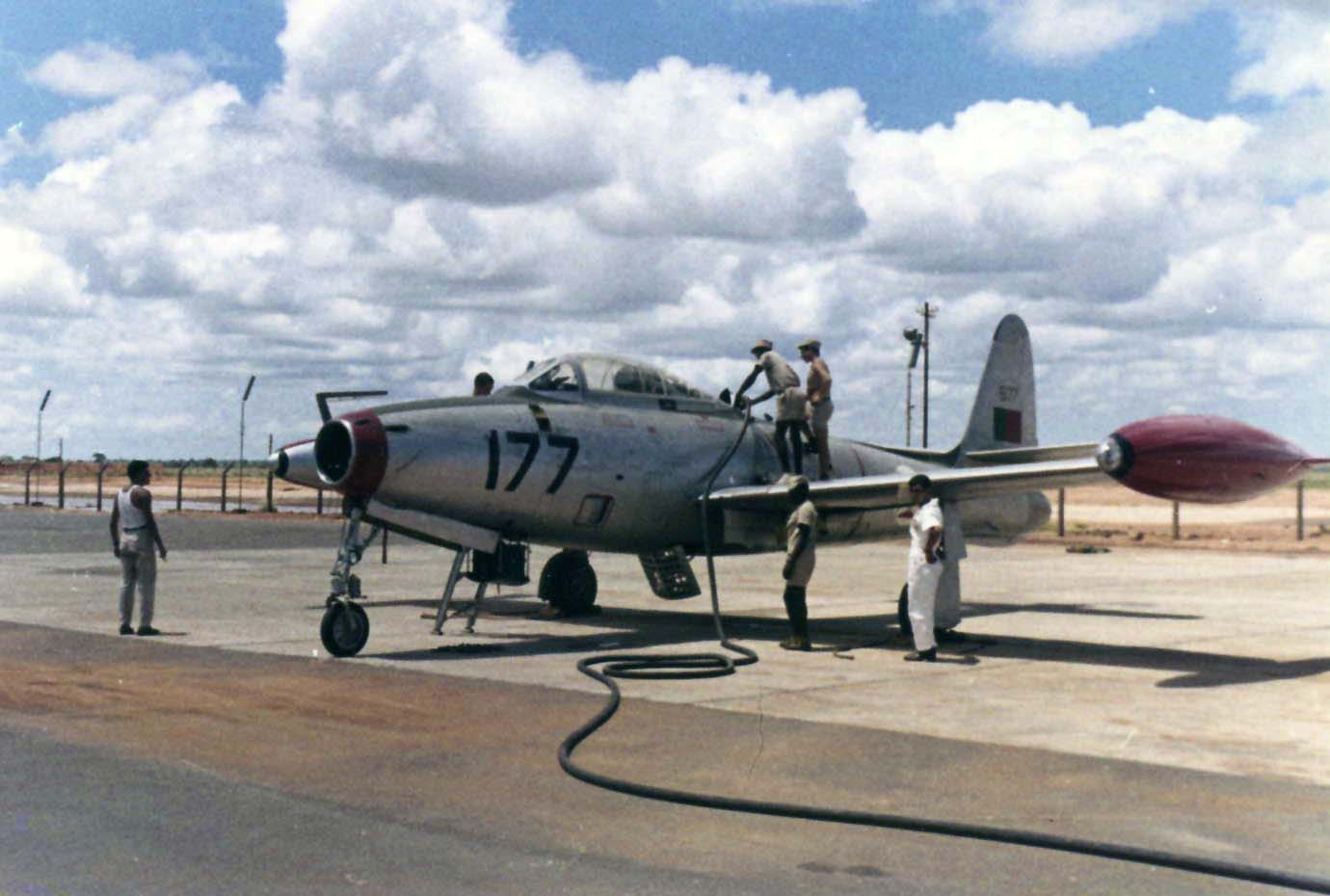
Portuguese Air Force F-84 Thunderjet.

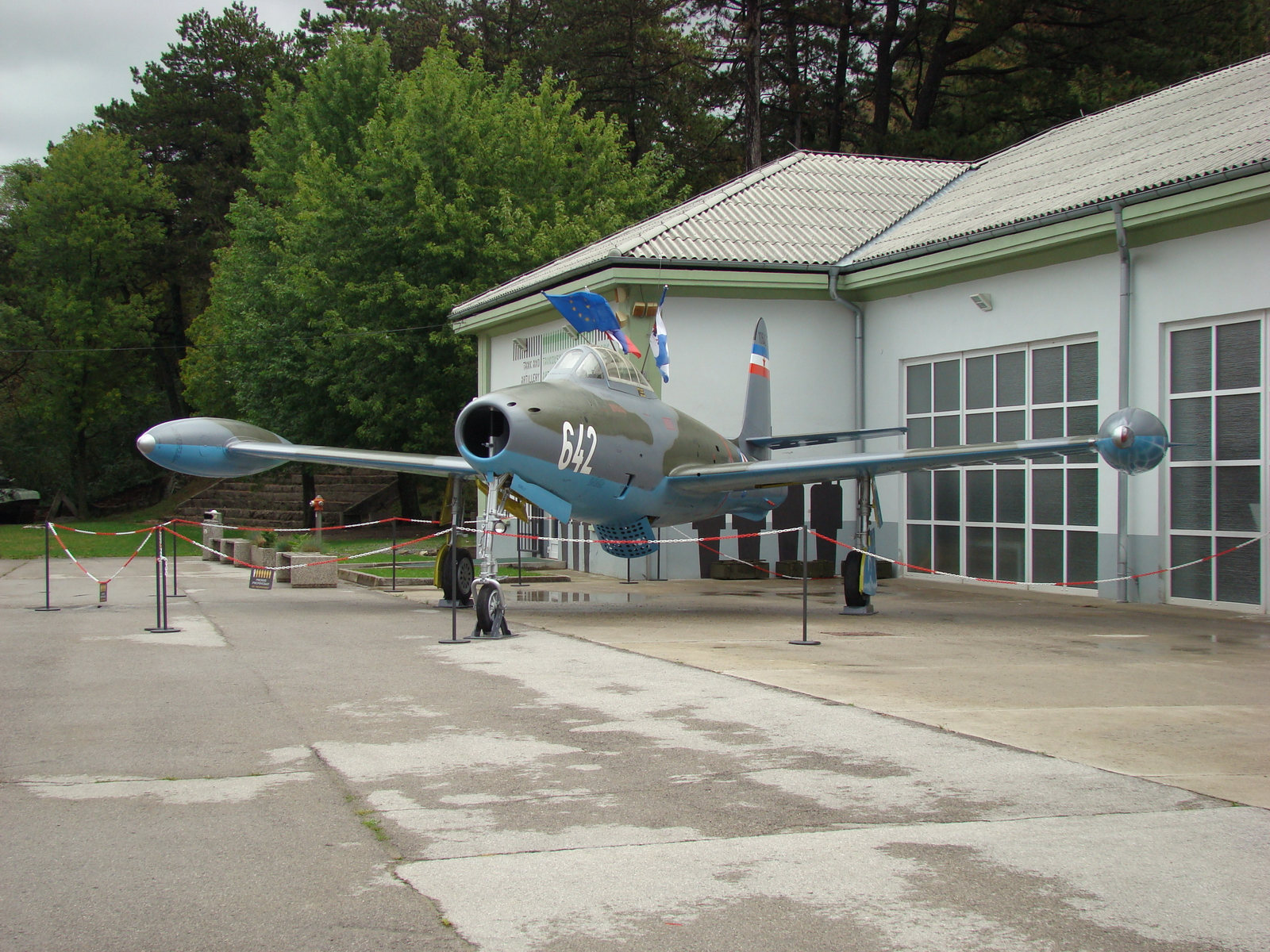
Yugoslav F-84 Pivka

Belgium

- Belgian Air Force operated 21 F-84Es and 192 F-84Gs, with deliveries from April 1951. Replaced by F-84Fs and RF-84Fs in 1956. 54 Thunderjets were destroyed in crashes in Belgian service, with 23 pilots killed.

Denmark

- Danish Air Force operated 240 F-84Gs from April 1952 until January 1962 and 6 F-84Es.

France

- French Air Force received about 140 F-84E and F-84Gs.

Greece

- Royal Hellenic Air Force received about 200 F-84Gs from 1952 until June 1960.

Iran

- Imperial Iranian Air Force operated 34 F-84Gs from May 1957 until February 1965 as part of a military aid program by the United States.

Italy

- Italian Air Force operated 254 F-84Gs.

Netherlands

- Netherlands Air Force operated 21 F-84Es and 179 F-84Gs. They equipped the 306, 311, 312, 313, 314, 315 and 316 Squadrons.

Norway

- Norwegian Air Force operated 6 F-84Es and 200 F-84Gs from 1951 to 1960.

Portugal

- Portuguese Air Force operated 125 F-84Gs from January 1953 until 1973.

Taiwan (Republic of China)

- Republic of China Air Force operated F-84Gs from 1953 until 1964.

Thailand

- Royal Thai Air Force operated 31 F-84Gs (designated B.Kh.16) from 1956 until 1966.

Turkey

- Turkish Air Force operated 479 F-84Gs from 1952

United States

- United States Air Force operated 226 F-84Bs, 191 F-84Cs, 154 F-84Ds, 743 F-84Es and 789 F-84Gs.

Yugoslavia

- Yugoslav Air Force operated 219 F-84Gs from June 1953 until 1974. In May 1963, one Thunderjet crashed and exploded on a building in Slavina, Postojna, killing two people as well as the pilot in the incident. It is the only military airplane incident to occur in Slovenia after the end of World War 2.

=== Major USAF operational F-84 units ===
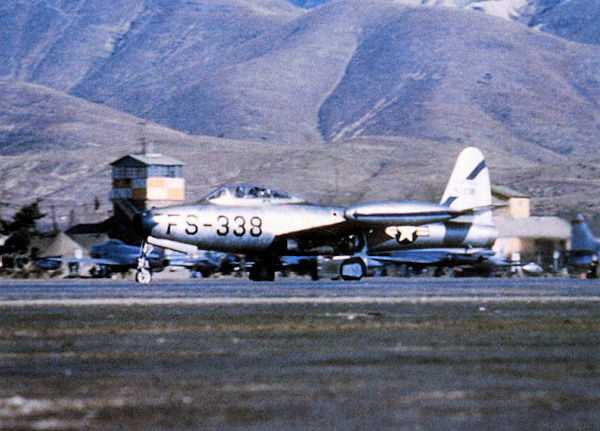
Republic F-84E-15-RE Thunderjet Serial 49-2338 of the 136th Fighter-Bomber Wing, South Korea

- 12th Fighter Escort Wing/Group — F-84E/G
- 14th Fighter Group — P/F-84B (1947–1949)
- 20th Fighter Bomber Wing/Group — F-84B/C/D/E/G
- 27th Fighter Escort Wing/Group — F-84E/G
- 31st Fighter Escort Wing/Group — F-84C/E/G
- 33rd Fighter Group — F-84C
- 36th Fighter-Bomber Wing — F-84E/G
- 48th Fighter-Bomber Wing — F-84G
- 49th Fighter Bomber Wing/Group — F-84E/G
- 58th Fighter Bomber Group — F-84E/G
- 78th Fighter Group (Note: Later become a part of 78th Fighter-Interceptor Wing.) — F-84D (1949–1952)
- 86th Fighter-Bomber Wing — F-84E/G
- 113th Fighter-Interceptor Wing — F-84C
- 116th Fighter Bomber Wing — F-84E
- 122nd Fighter-Interceptor Wing — F-84C
- 123rd Fighter Bomber Wing — F-84B/D/E
- 132nd Fighter Bomber Wing — F-84B
- 136th Fighter Bomber Wing/Group — F-84E/D
- 137th Fighter-Bomber Wing — F-84B/C/D
- 312th Fighter Bomber Group — F-84E/G (1954–1955)
- 406th Fighter-Bomber Wing — F-84E
- 474th Fighter Bomber Wing — F-84E/G
- 506th Strategic Fighter Wing — F-84G
- 508th Strategic Fighter Wing — F-84G
- 4702d Fighter-Interceptor Wing — F-84D
- 4709th Fighter-Interceptor Wing — F-84G
- 4710th Fighter-Interceptor Wing — F-84G (1953)
- 4925th Test Group (Atomic) — F-84E/G

=== Royal Netherlands Air Force operational F-84 units ===
Data from Warplane Classic: Republic F-84 Thunderjet, Thunderstreak and Thunderflash

- 306 Squadron — F-84E
- 311 Squadron — F-84E
- 312 Squadron — F-84G
- 313 Squadron — F-84E
- 314 Squadron — F-84G
- 315 Squadron — F-84G
- 316 Squadron — F-84G

== Specifications (F-84G Thunderjet) ==
Line drawing of F-84C

Data from Thunderjets in Korea

General characteristics

- Crew: 1
- Length: 38 ft 1 in (11.61 m)
- Wingspan: 36 ft 5 in (11.10 m)
- Height: 12 ft 7 in (3.84 m)
- Wing area: 260 sq ft (24 m^{2})
- Airfoil: Republic R-4,45-1512-.9 (12%)
- Empty weight: 11,095 lb (5,033 kg)
- Gross weight: 18,645 lb (8,457 kg)
- Max takeoff weight: 23,525 lb (10,671 kg)
- Fuel capacity: 450 US gal (1,700 L) internal fuel
- Powerplant: 1 × Allison J35-A-29 turbojet engine, 5,600 lbf (25 kN) thrust

Performance

- Maximum speed: 622 mph (1,001 km/h, 541 kn) at sea level
- Cruise speed: 483 mph (777 km/h, 420 kn) at 35,000 ft (11,000 m)
- Range: 670 mi (1,080 km, 580 nmi) using internal fuel
- Ferry range: 2,000 mi (3,200 km, 1,700 nmi) with external tanks
- Service ceiling: 40,500 ft (12,300 m)
- Time to altitude: 7.9 minutes to 35,000 ft (11,000 m)

Armament

- Guns: 6 × .50 in (12.7 mm) M3 Browning machine guns, 300 rounds per gun
- Rockets: Up to 32 5-inch rockets
- Bombs: 4,000 lb (1,800 kg) bombs, including 1 × Mark 7 nuclear bomb

== See also ==
Related development

- F-84F Thunderstreak
- Republic XF-91 Thunderceptor
- XF-84H Thunderscreech

Aircraft of comparable role, configuration, and era

- Dassault Ouragan
- de Havilland Venom
- Gloster Meteor
- Grumman F9F Cougar
- Grumman F9F Panther
- McDonnell XF-85 Goblin
