= Ota (Alenquer) =

- Civil parish
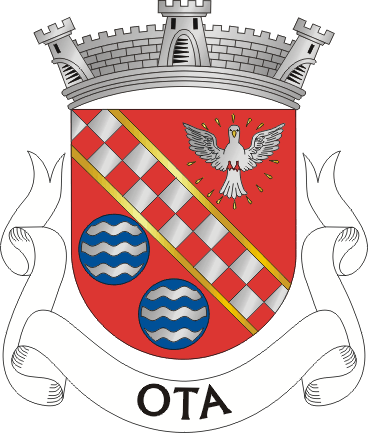
- Coat of arms

- Location in Portugal
- Coordinates: 39.110°N 8.990°W
- Country: Portugal
- Region: Oeste e Vale do Tejo
- Intermunic. comm.: Oeste
- District: Lisbon
- Municipality: Alenquer

Area
  - Total: 46.32 km^{2} (17.88 sq mi)

Population (2011)
  - Total: 1,289
  - Density: 28/km^{2} (72/sq mi)
- Time zone: UTC+00:00 (WET)
  - Summer (DST): UTC+01:00 (WEST)

Ota (Portuguese pronunciation: [ˈɔtɐ]) is a Portuguese freguesia ("civil parish"), located in the municipality of Alenquer. The population in 2011 was 1289, in an area of 46.32 km^{2}.

== Ota Airport ==
Although Ota was originally chosen as the site for Lisbon's new airport, after much debate, Alcochete was chosen instead.

It houses the former Ota Air Base, which now currently serves as the Military and Technical Training Center of the Air Force (CFMTFA).

== See also ==
- Ota Airport
- Military and Technical Training Center of the Air Force
