= The Lactation of Saint Bernard =

Painting by Josefa de Óbidos

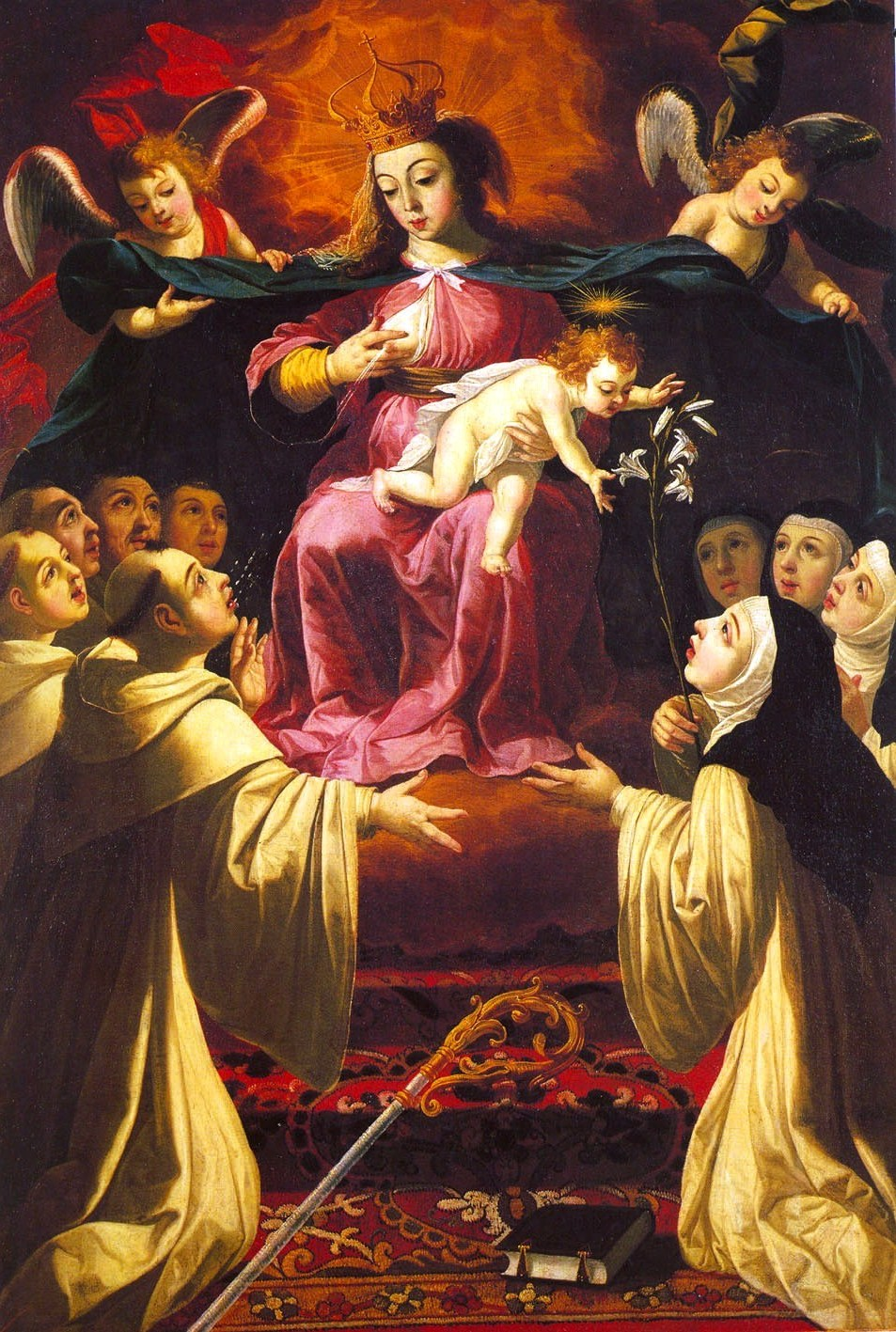
- Artist: Josefa de Óbidos
- Year: c. 1660-1670
- Type: Oil on canvas
- Dimensions: 113 cm × 78 cm (44 in × 31 in)
- Location: Machado de Castro National Museum, Coimbra

The Lactation of Saint Bernard is an oil on canvas painting by the Portuguese artist Josefa de Óbidos, from c. 1660-1670. It is held at the Machado de Castro National Museum, in Coimbra.

== Description ==
This vertical painting depicts the Virgin Mary nursing Saint Bernard of Clairvaux during an apparition witnessed by other Cistercians, who also kneel before her.

The Virgin Mary is depicted seated on a throne and wearing a crown. She overlooks the monks from there. She presses her right breast to make milk flow for the preacher, who receives it in his mouth with outstretched arms. In profile in the lower left quarter of the composition, Saint Bernard is recognizable among five monks, with his crozier, his attribute as a saint, lying in the ground nearby. The miracle bestows on him great eloquence.

Meanwhile, the Christ Child seems indifferent to the miracle. Held by his mother's other hand, he leans towards the lily held by one of the four nuns in the lower right quadrant of the painting. At the same time, two cherubs in flight against an orange sky part her blue mantle on either side of the Virgin Mary, who thus protects those who venerate her. This way, the painting merges in a single representation, a Maestà, a Virgo lactans, and a Virgin of Mercy, by this depiction of Lactatio Bernardi or the lactation of Saint Bernard.

Another version of the same painting, showing Saint Bernard alone, is held in a private collection.
