= Machado de Castro National Museum =

Art museum in Coimbra, Portugal

Coordinates: 40°12′31.65″N 8°25′31.78″W

- Museu Nacional de Machado de Castro
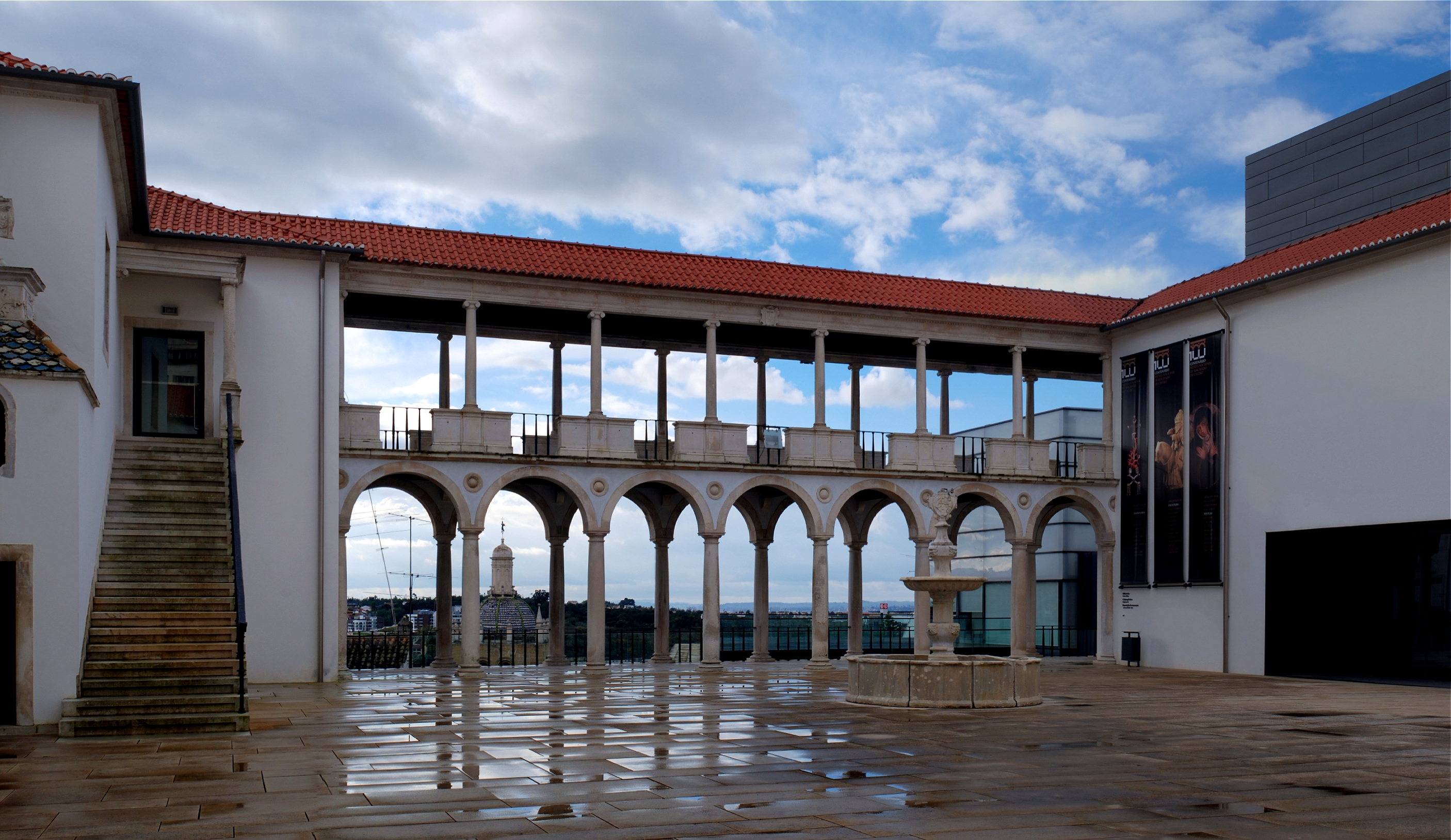
- The museum's courtyard
- Established: 1913
- Location: Coimbra, Portugal
- Type: Art museum
- Website: www.museumachadocastro.gov.pt/en-GB/default.aspx

The Machado de Castro National Museum (Portuguese: Museu Nacional de Machado de Castro) is an art museum in Coimbra, Portugal, named after the renowned Portuguese sculptor Joaquim Machado de Castro. It first opened in 1913 and its latest renovation (2004–2012), which included the addition of a new building, was awarded the Piranesi/Prix de Rome Prize 2014.

== Building ==
The museum is housed in the former Bishop's Palace. This palace was built from the Middle Ages onwards roughly on the site where the Roman forum of Aeminium (Coimbra's Roman name) once stood. The remains of this distant past, the Cryptoporticus, can be visited on the lower floors of the museum.

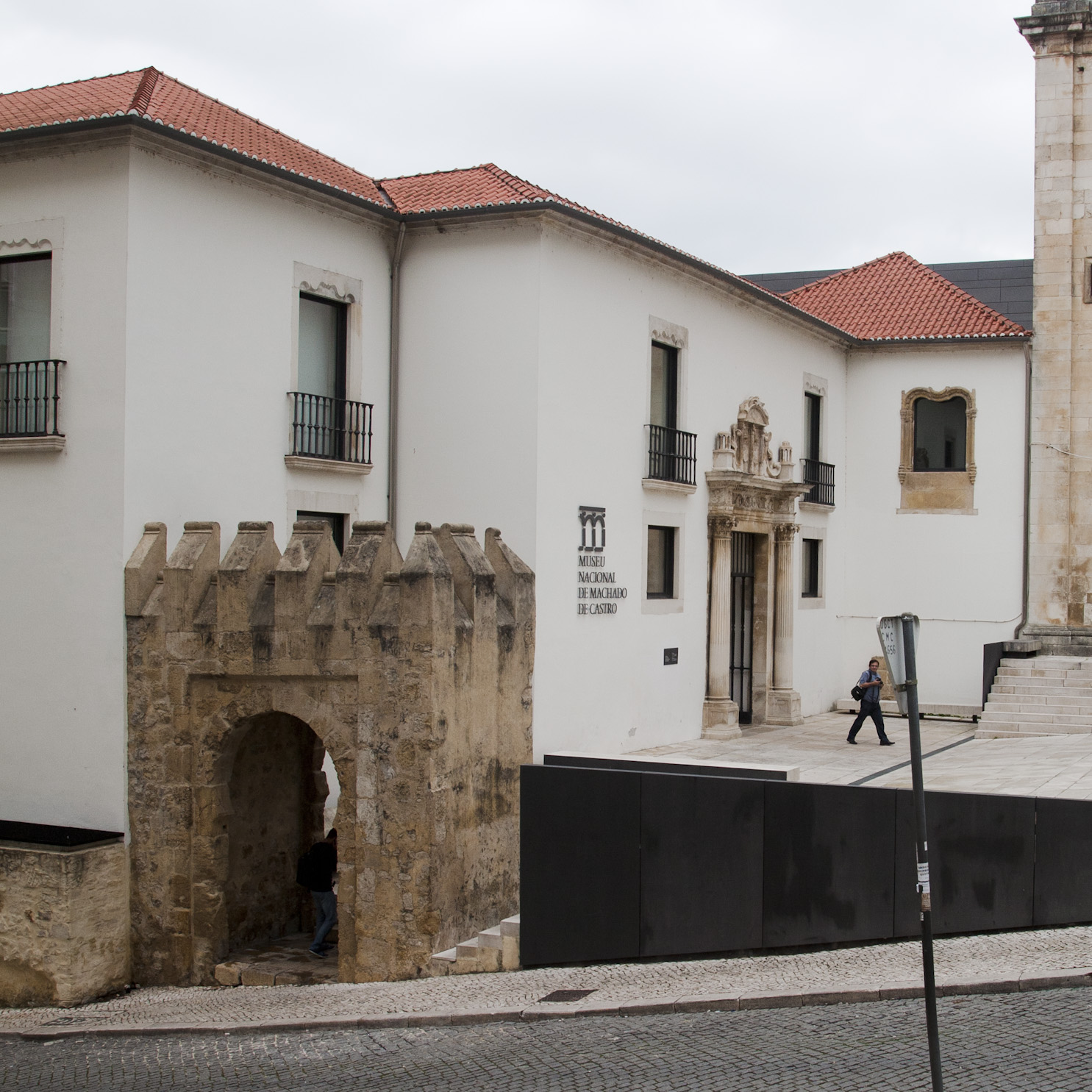
Medieval entrance; entrance to the museum

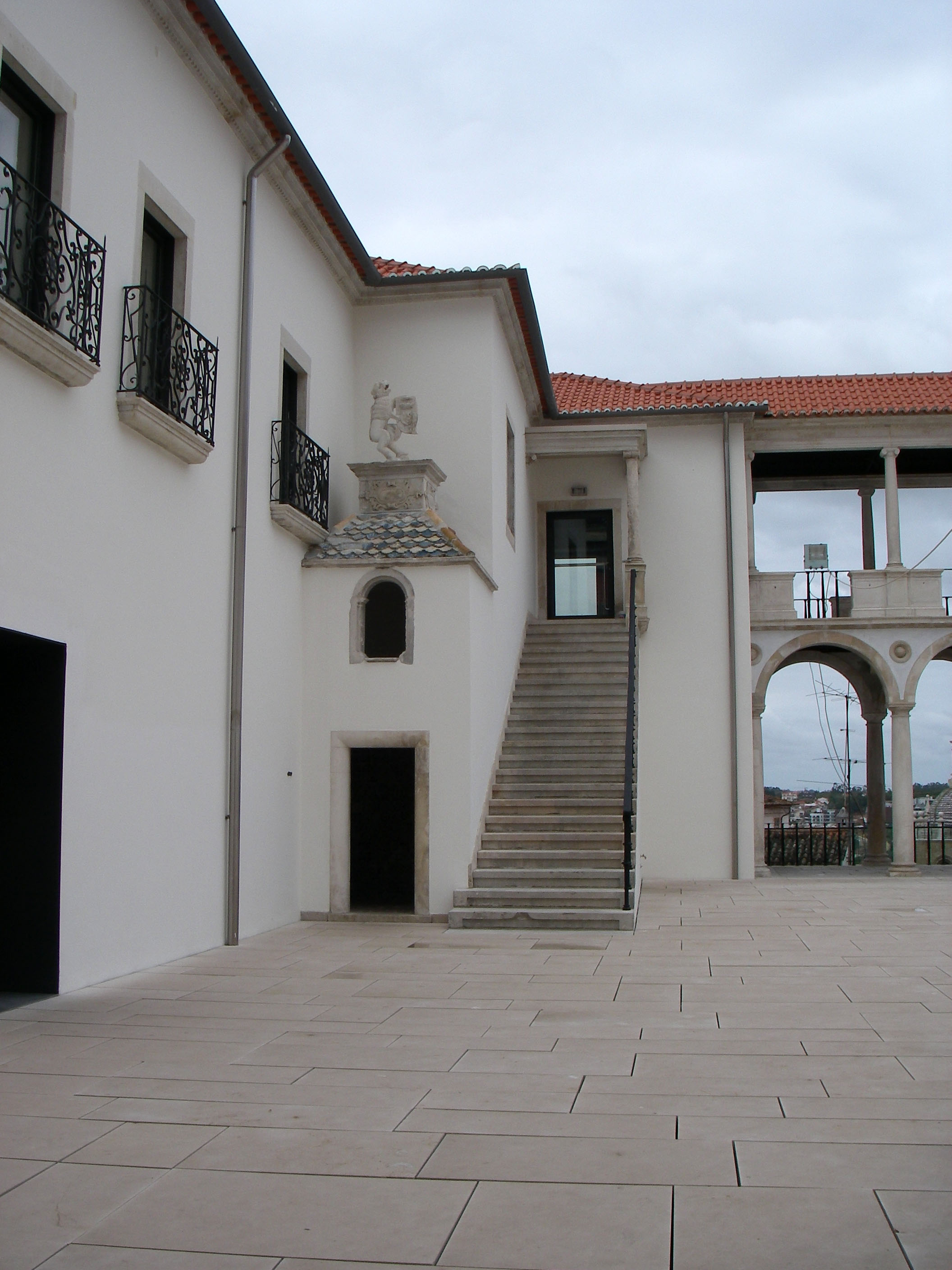
Former Bishop's Palace

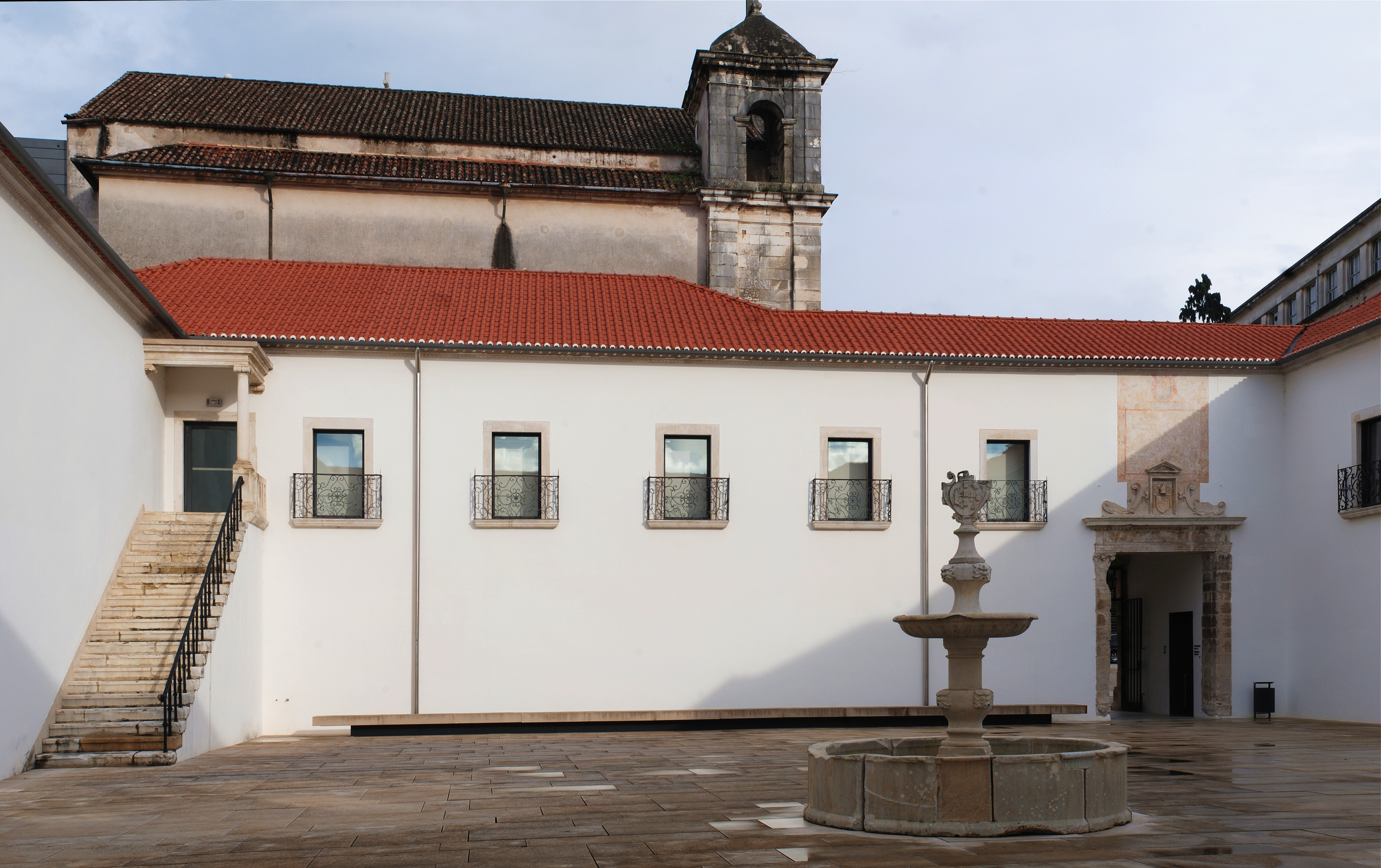
Former Bishop's Palace

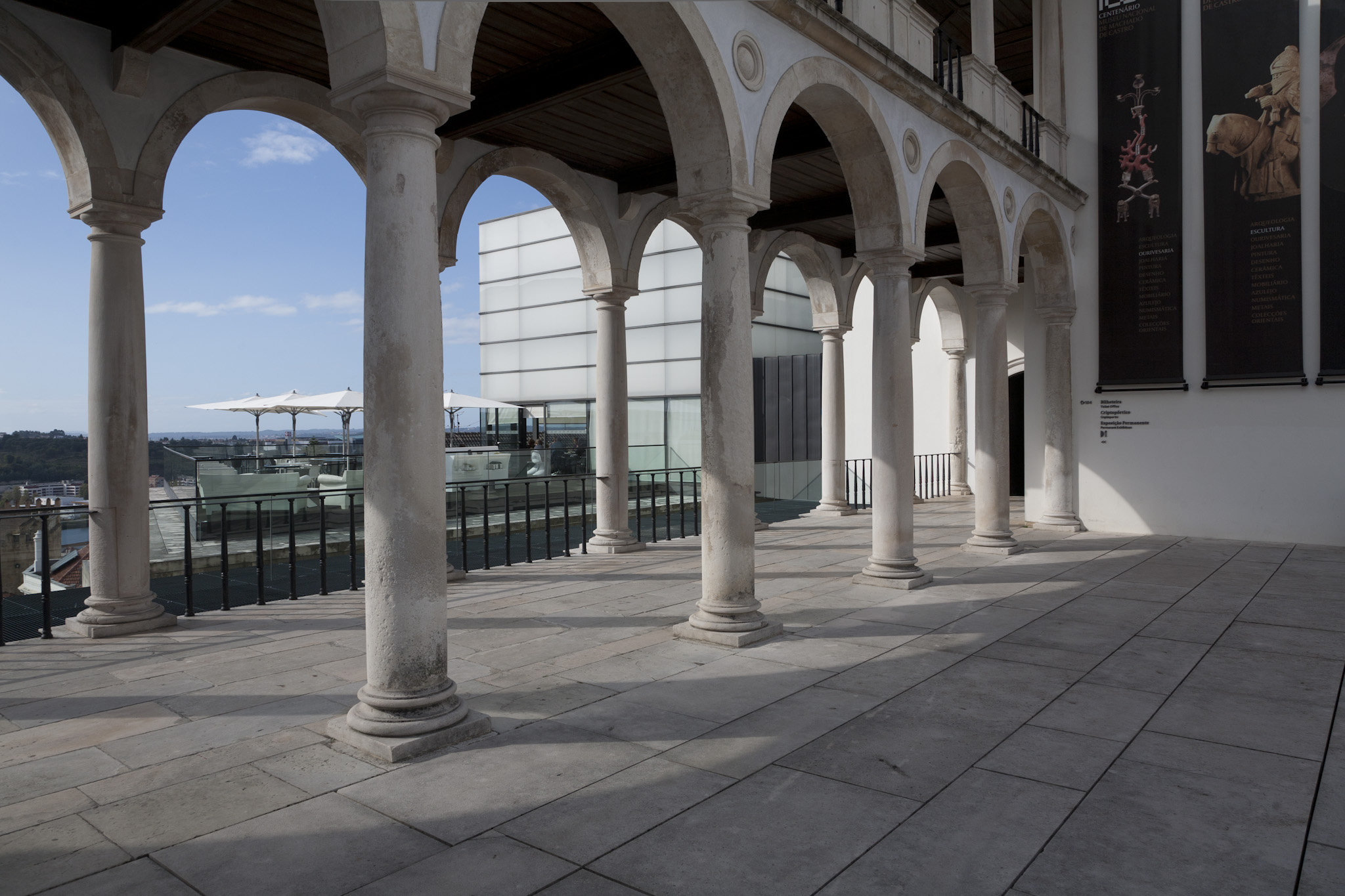
Access to the museum

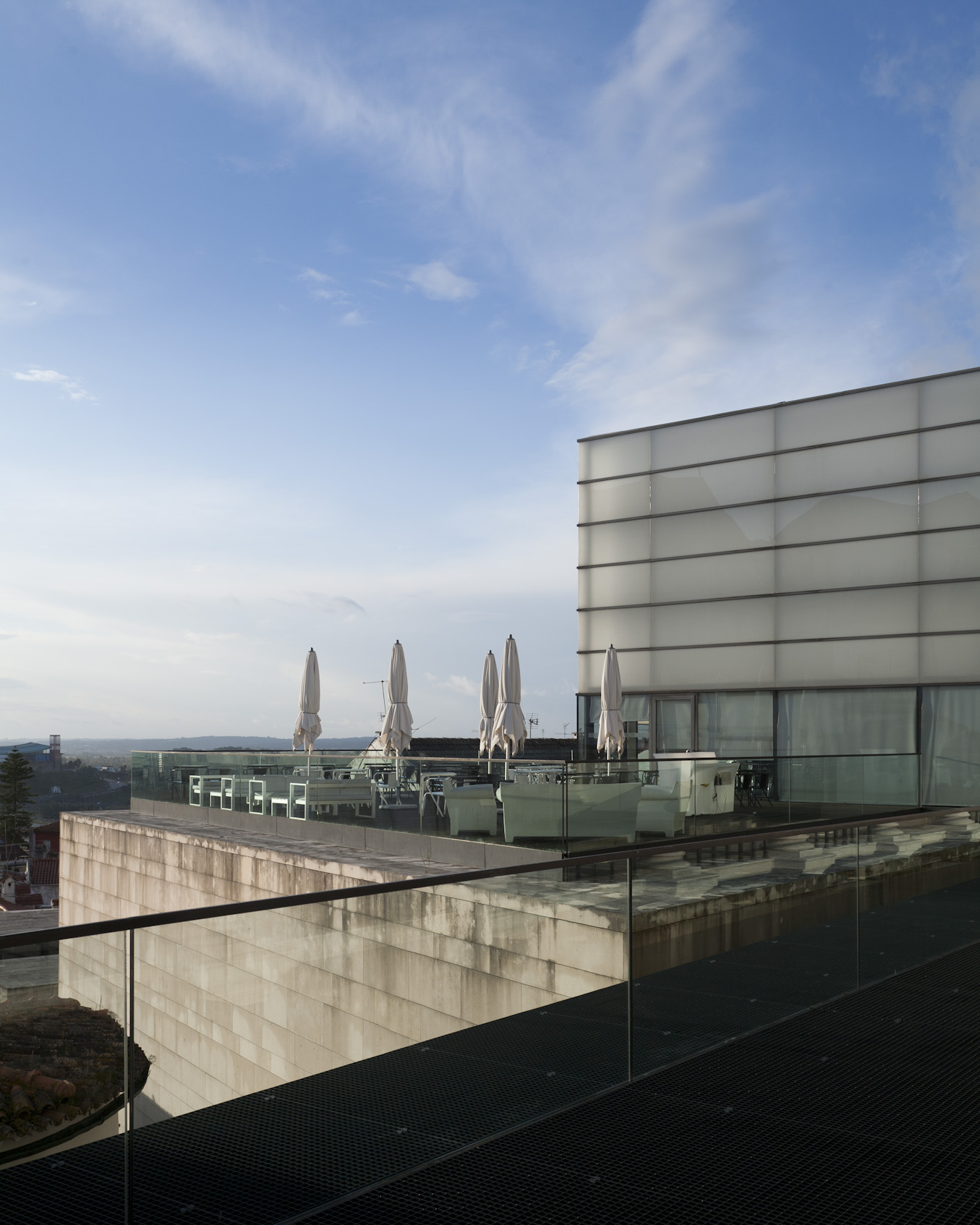
New restaurant

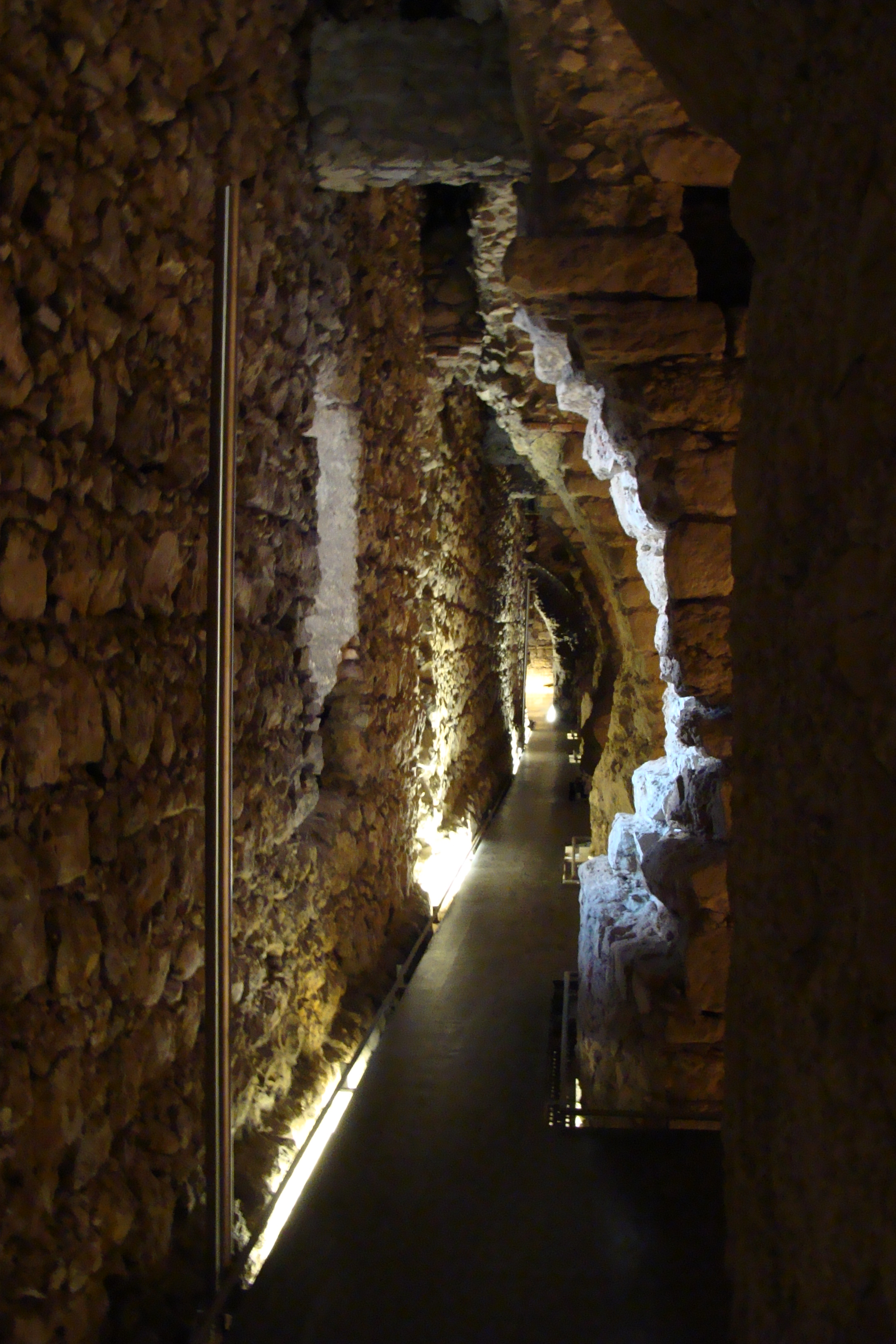
Roman Cryptoporticus

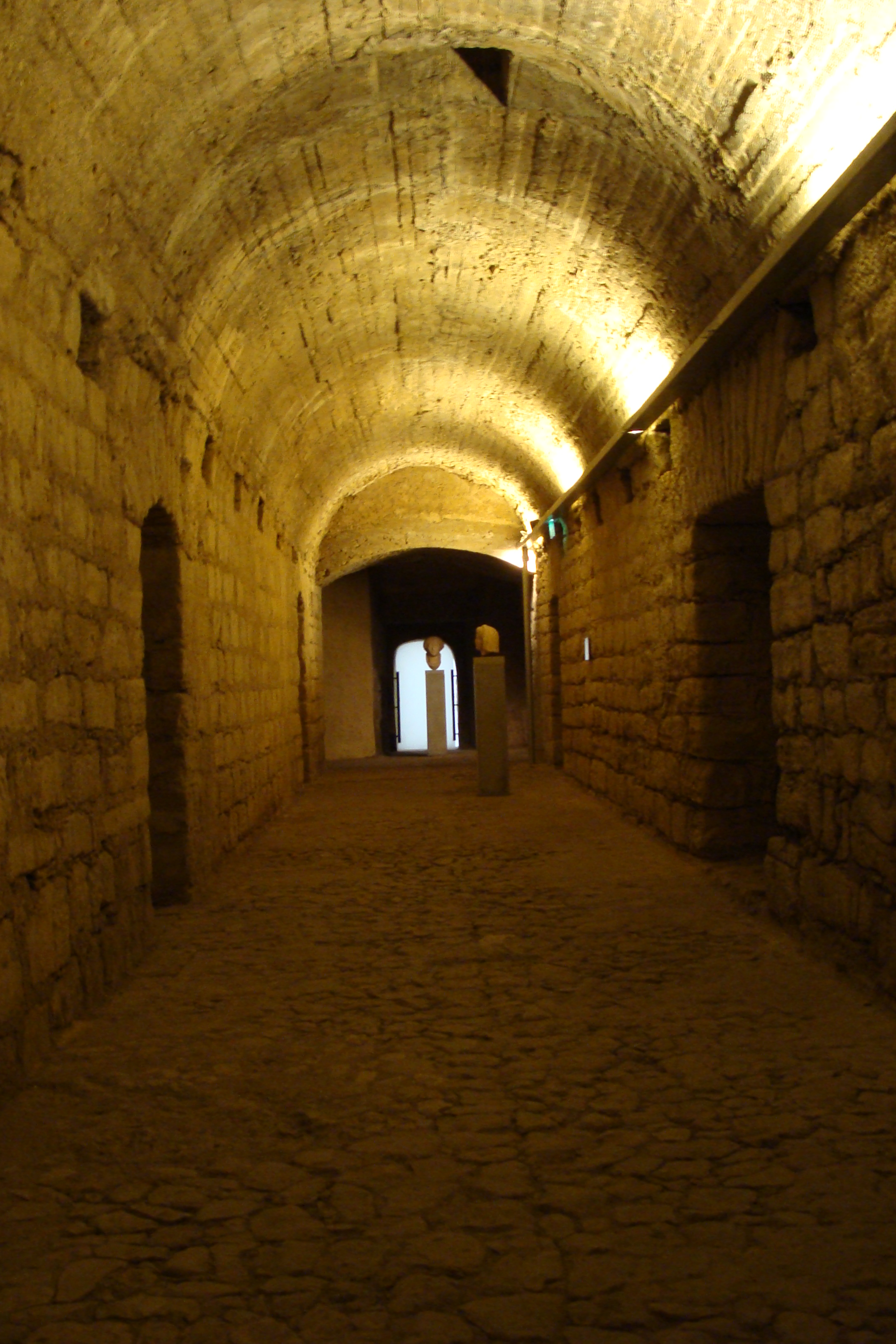
Roman Cryptoporticus

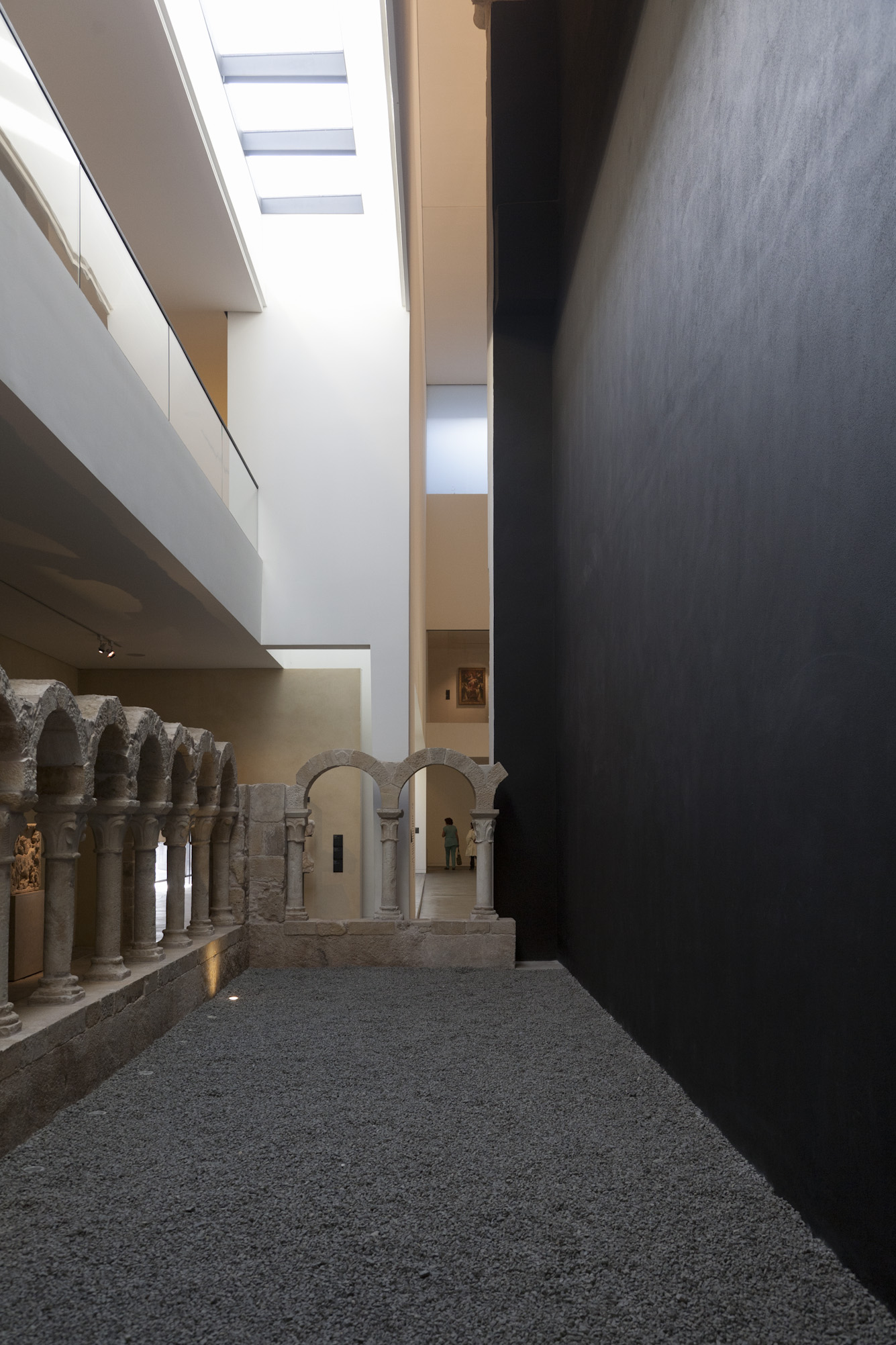
Museum interior (new building)

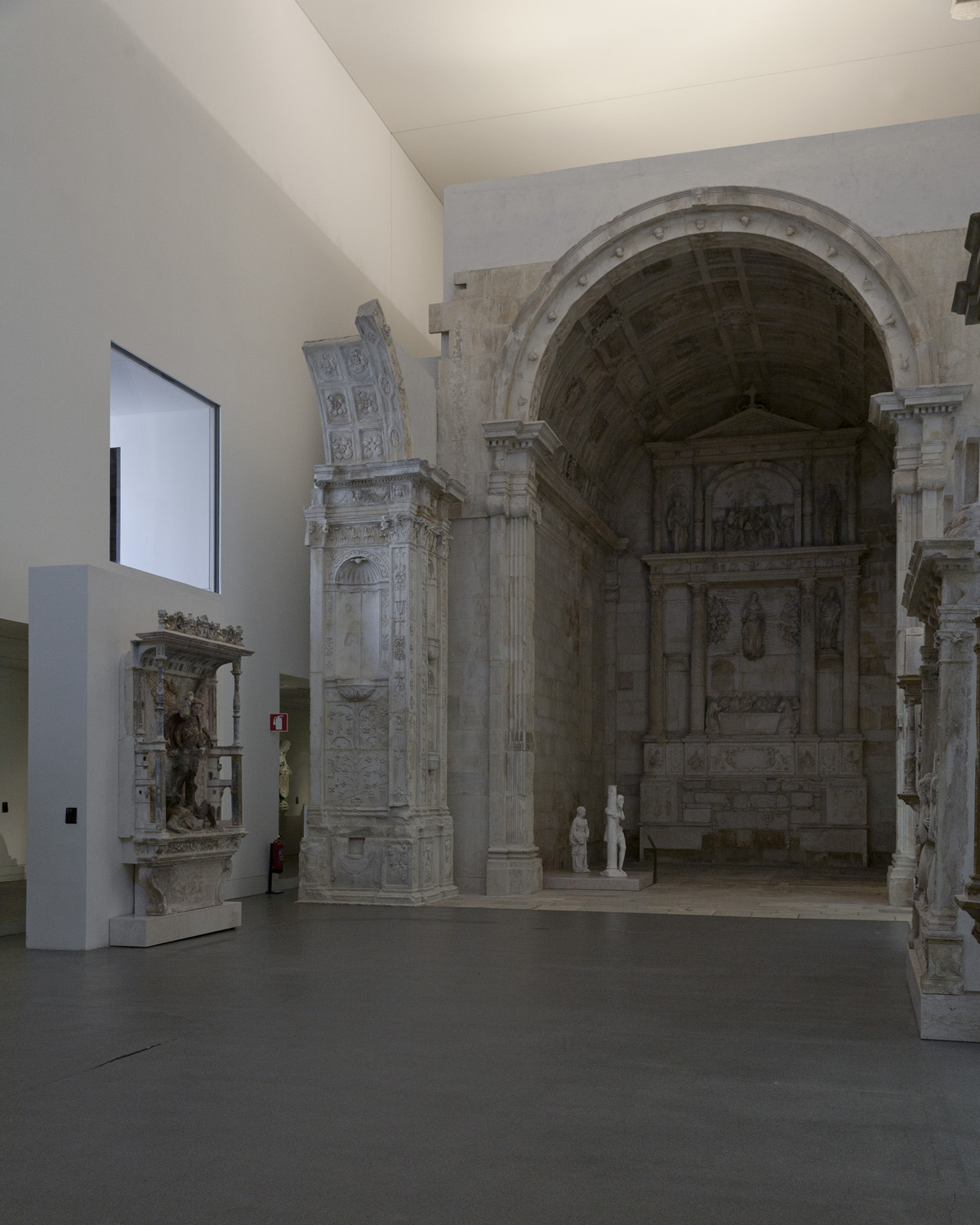
Museum interior (new building)

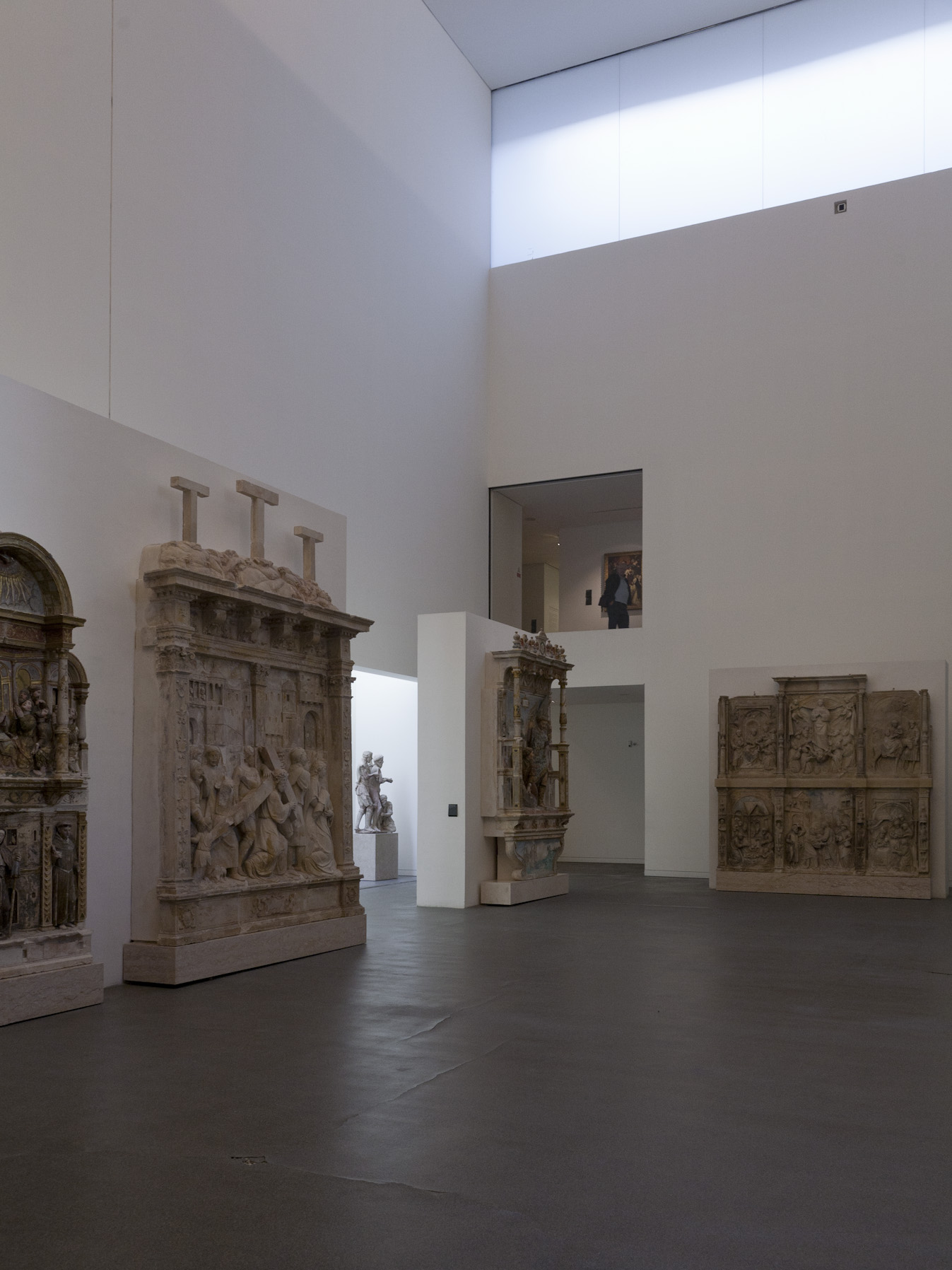
Museum interior (new building)

== Collections ==
The bulk of the museum's collection is made up of items from churches and religious institutions in the area surrounding Coimbra. The collections of sculpture (the most extensive of all the national museums of Portugal), painting, precious metals, ceramics and textiles are especially noteworthy.

=== Archaeology ===
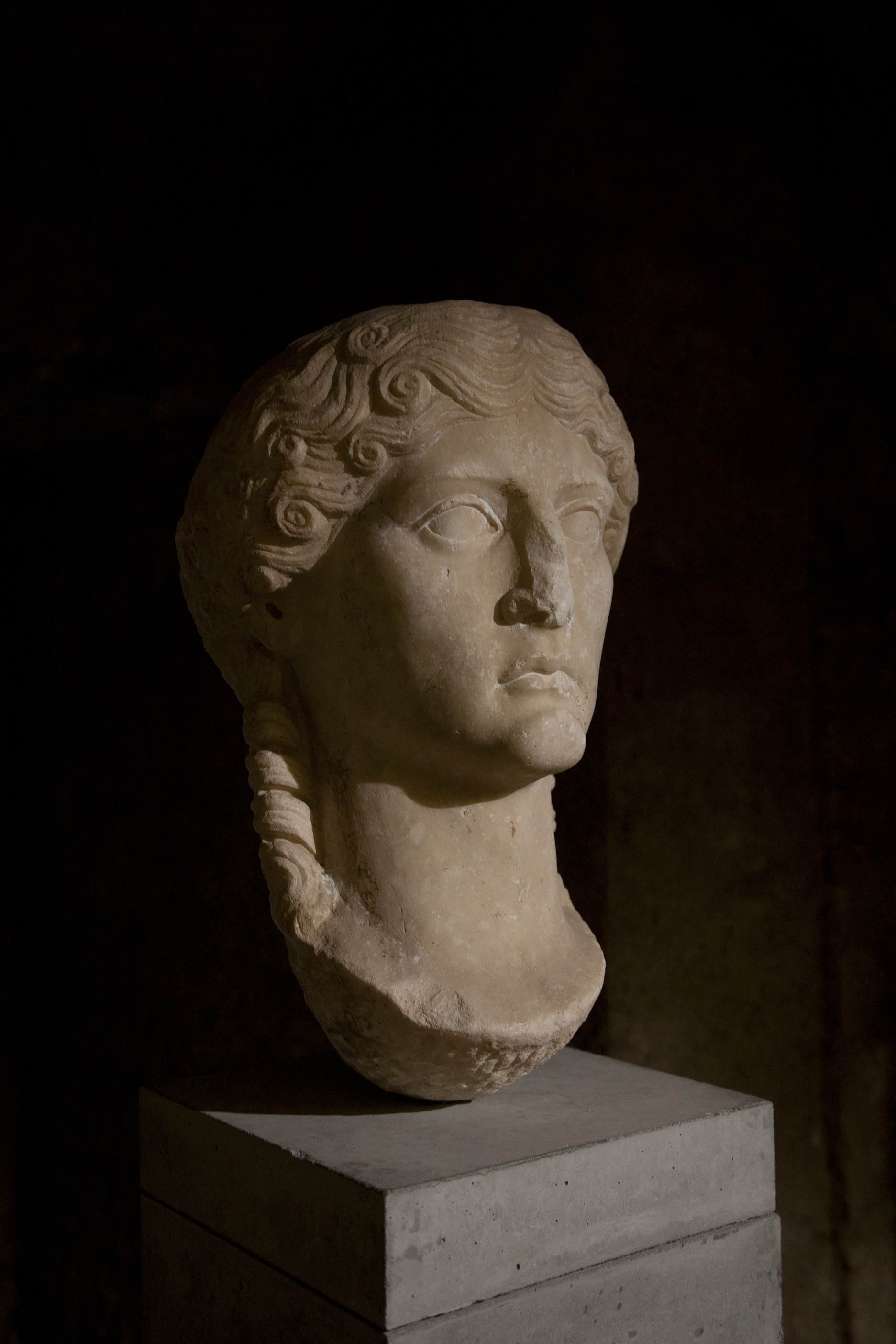
Portrait of Agripina, 1st Century, 54 x 34 x 34 cm

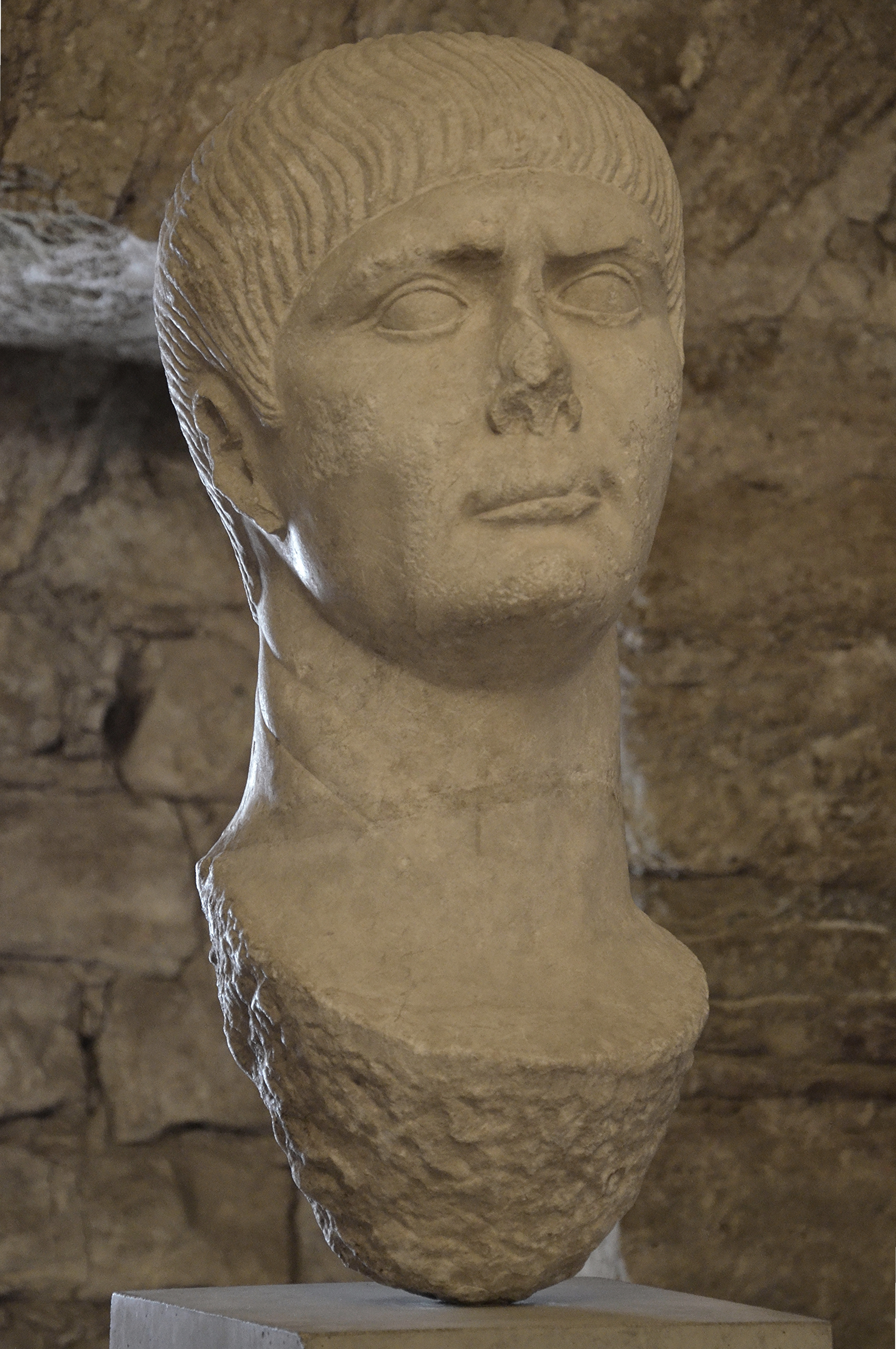
Portrait of Trajan, 1st-2nd Century, 70 x 32 x 34 cm

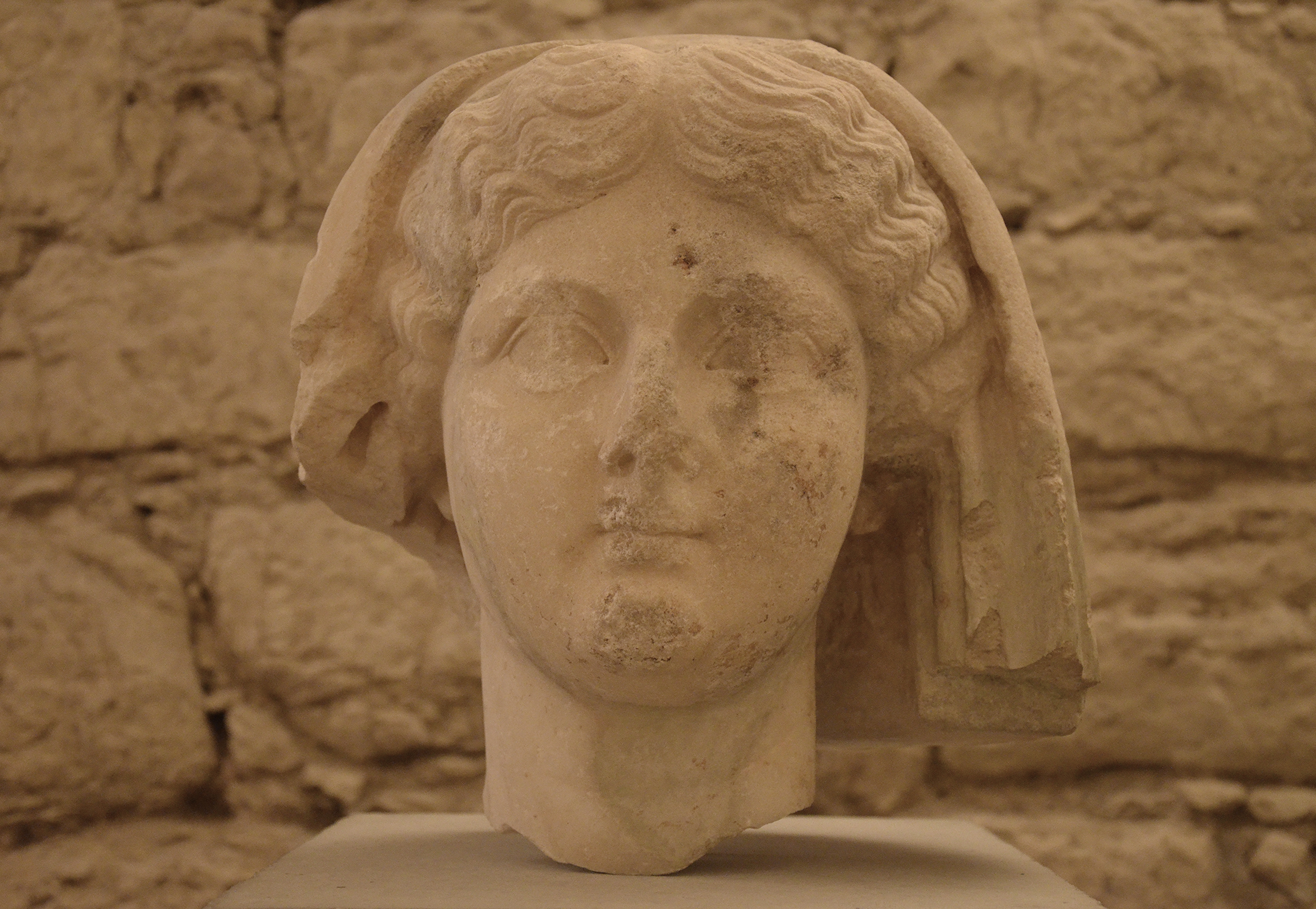
Female Portrait, 1st Century, 32 x 32 x 22 cm

=== Sculpture ===
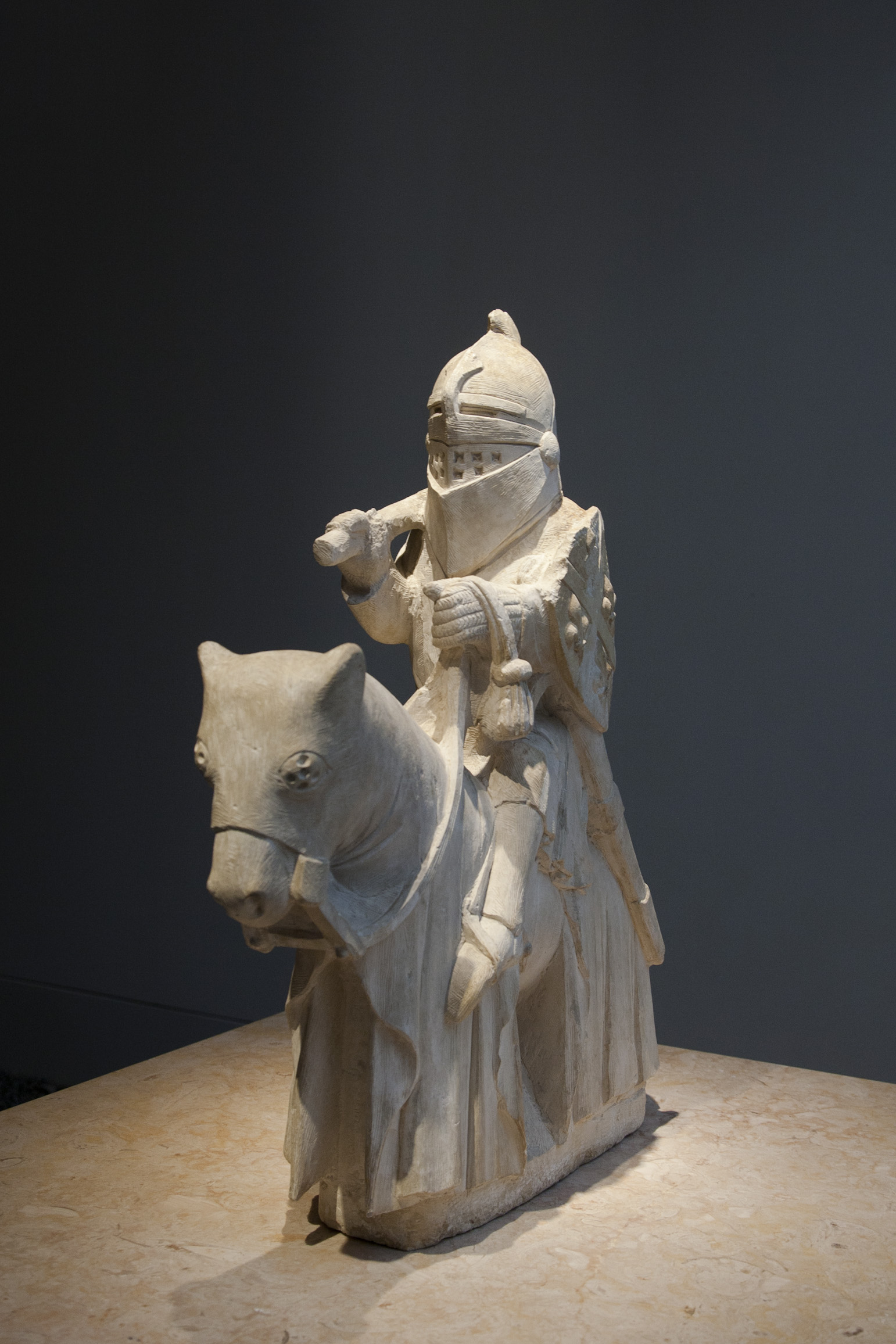
Master Pero, Medieval Knight, 14th Century, 72 x 65 x 19,5 cm

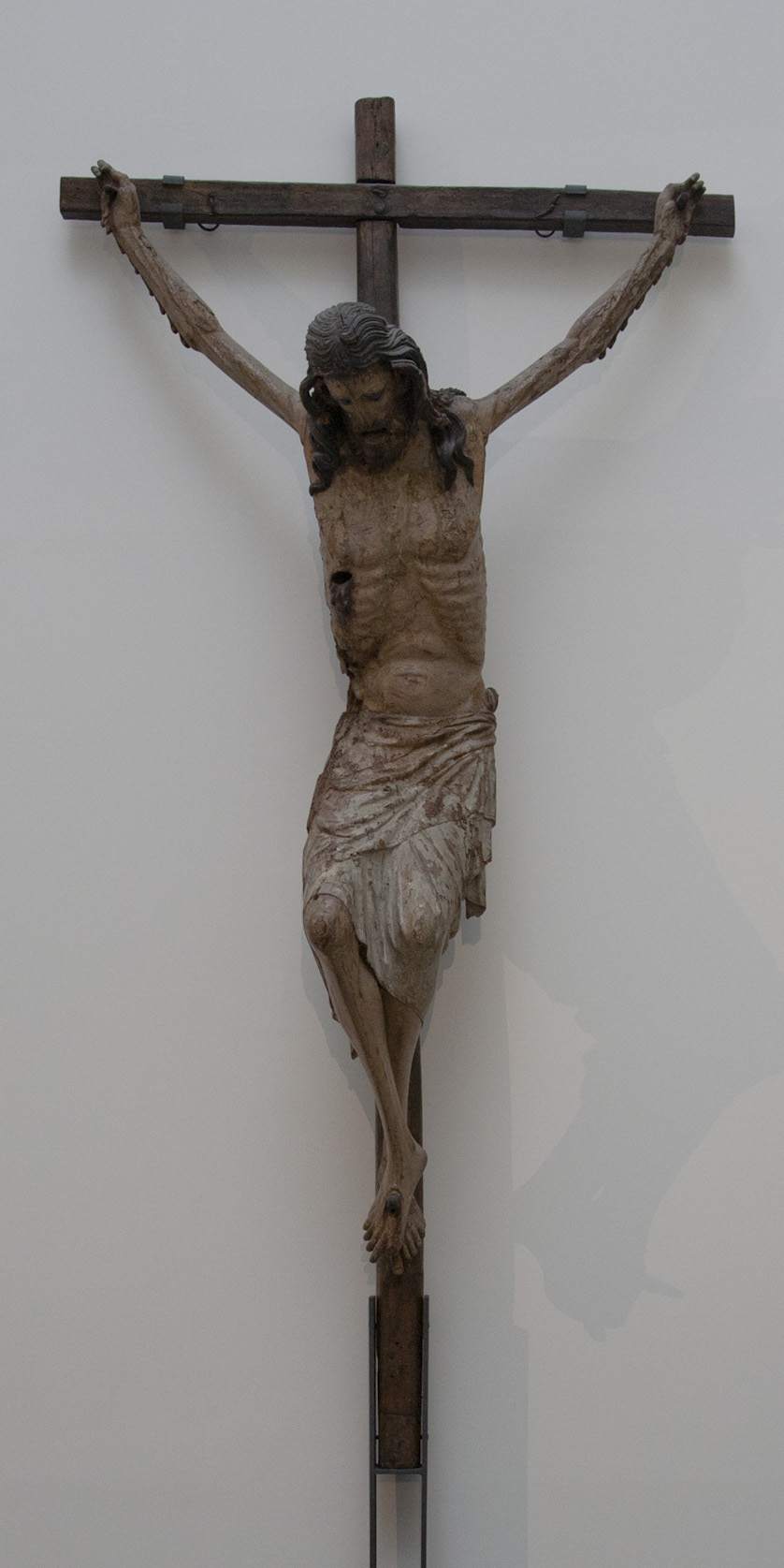
Unknown author, Black Christ, 14th Century, wood, 284,5 x 140 x 61 cm

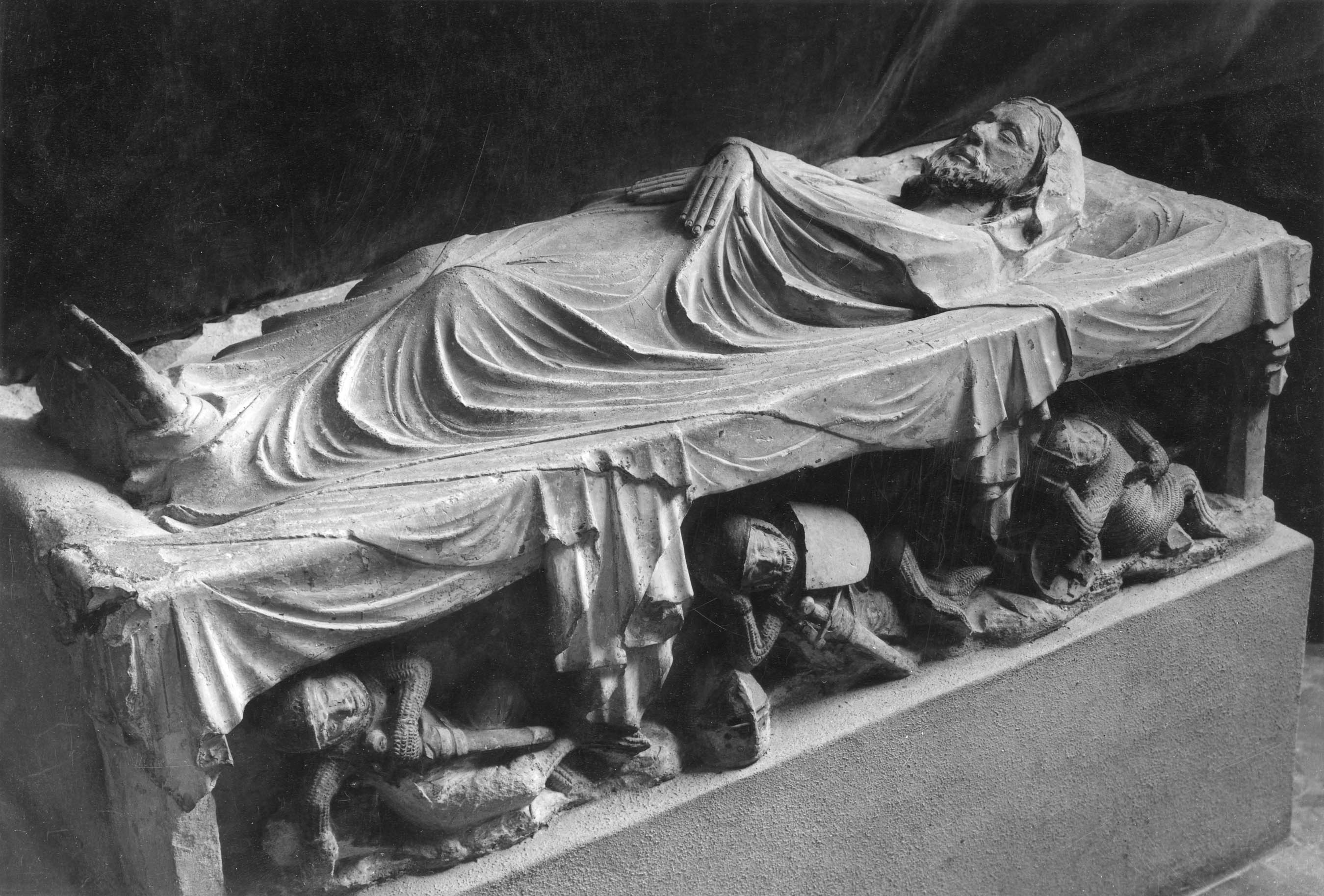
Unknown author, Christ in His Tomb, 14th-15th Century, stone, 64 x 151 x 65 cm

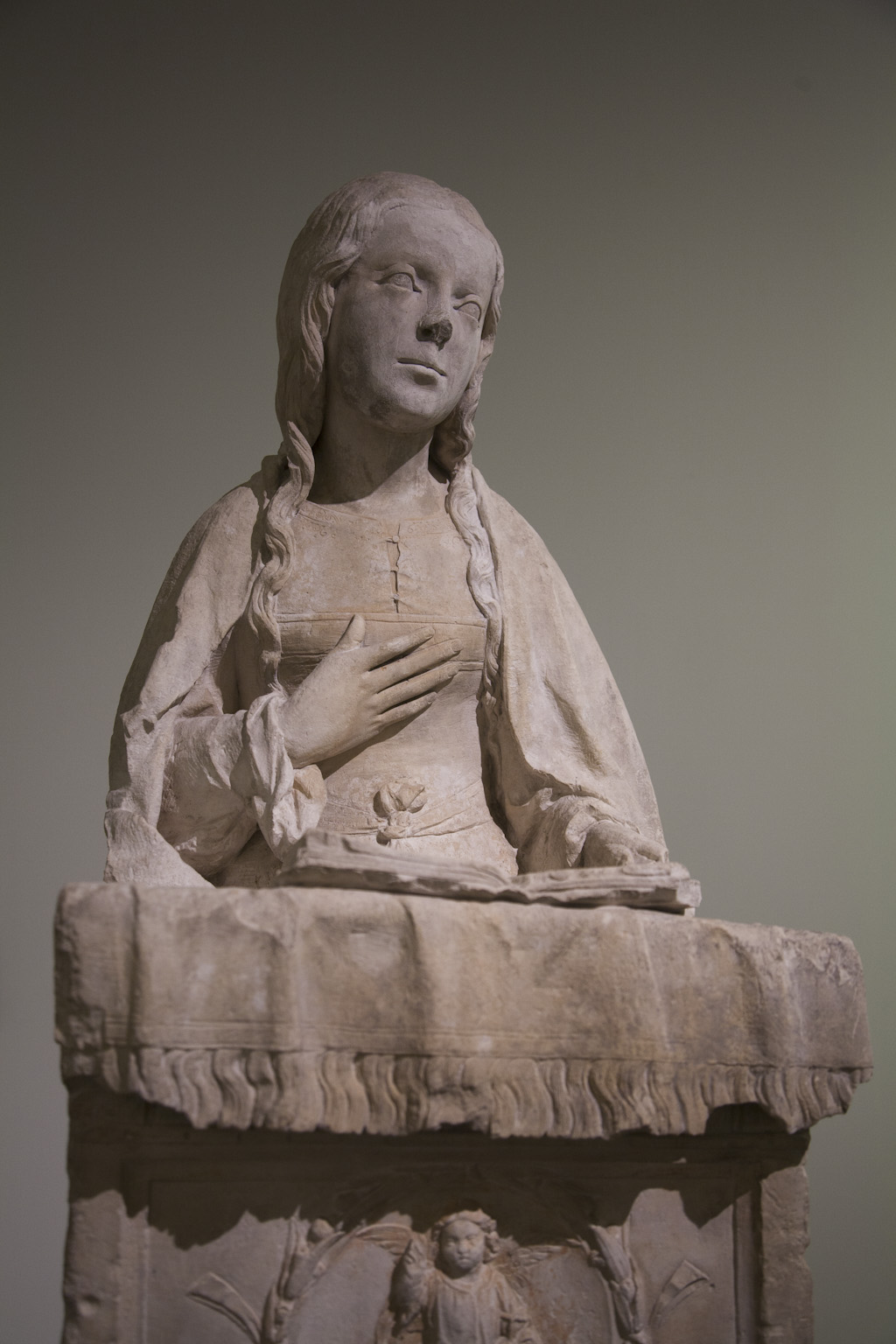
Master of the Royal Tombs, Virgin of the Annunciation, 1500-1525

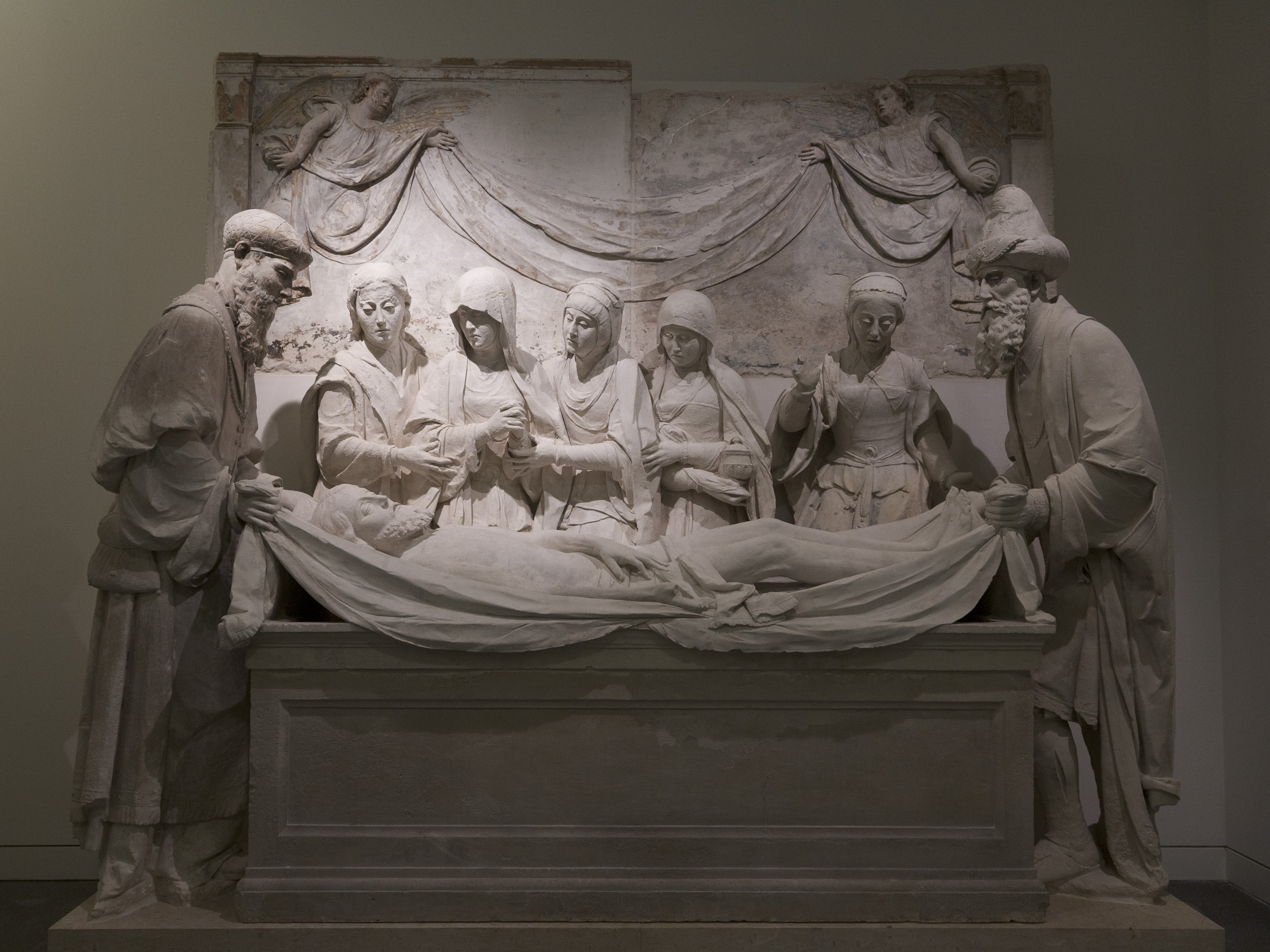
João de Ruão, Deposition of Christ, 1535-1540, 222 x 225 cm

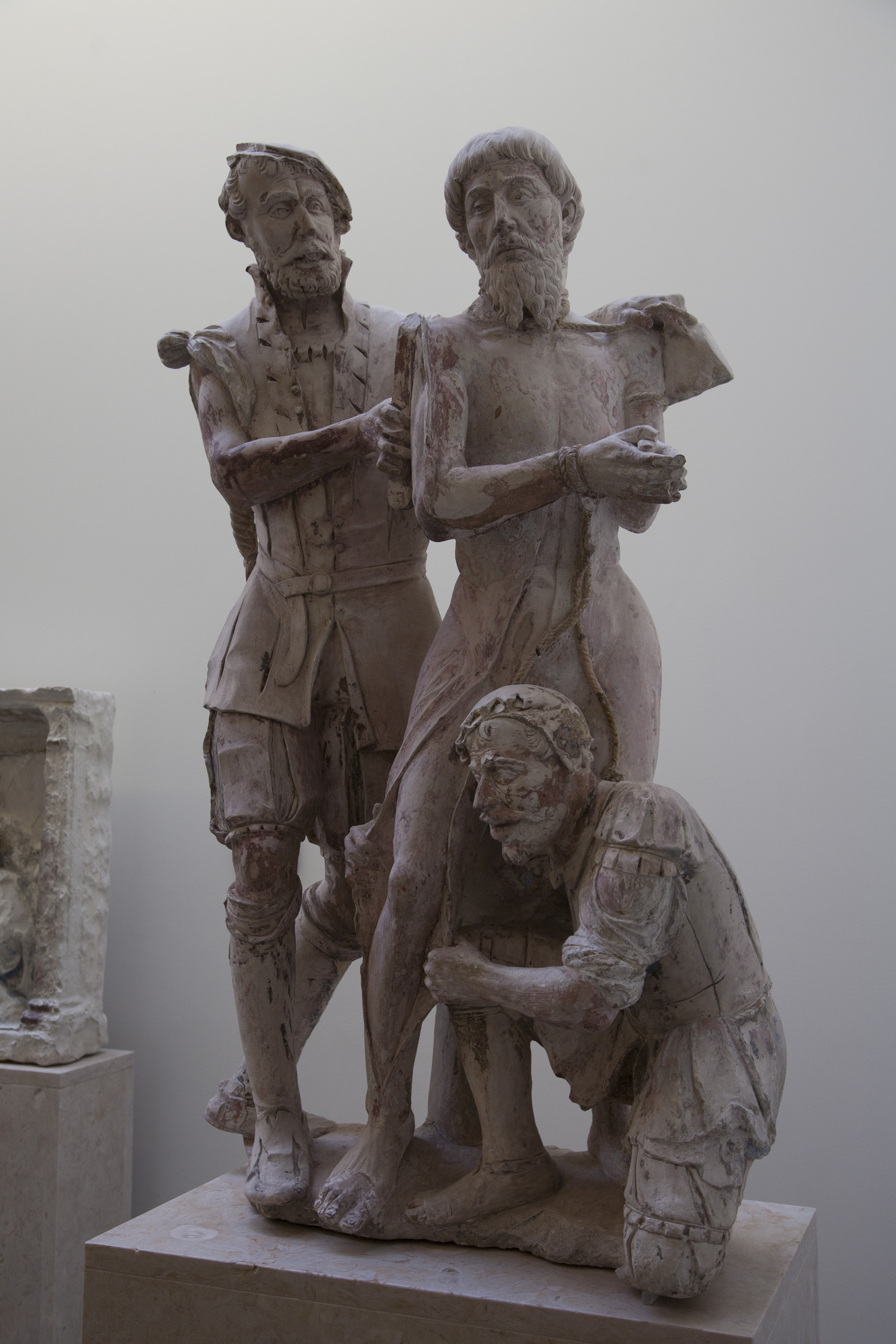
João de Ruão, St. Bartholomew's Martyrdom, 16th Century

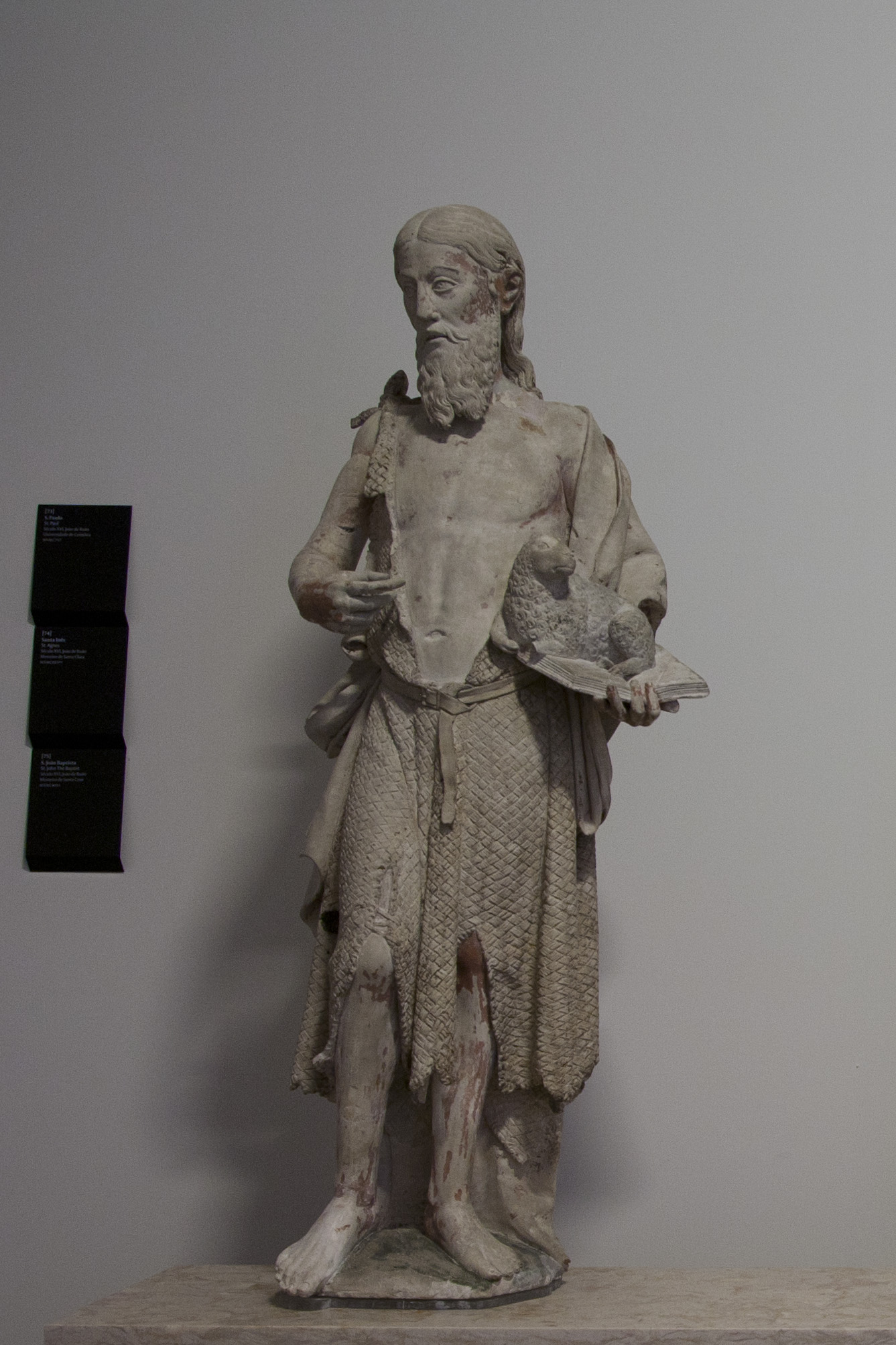
João de Ruão, St. John the Baptist, 16th Century

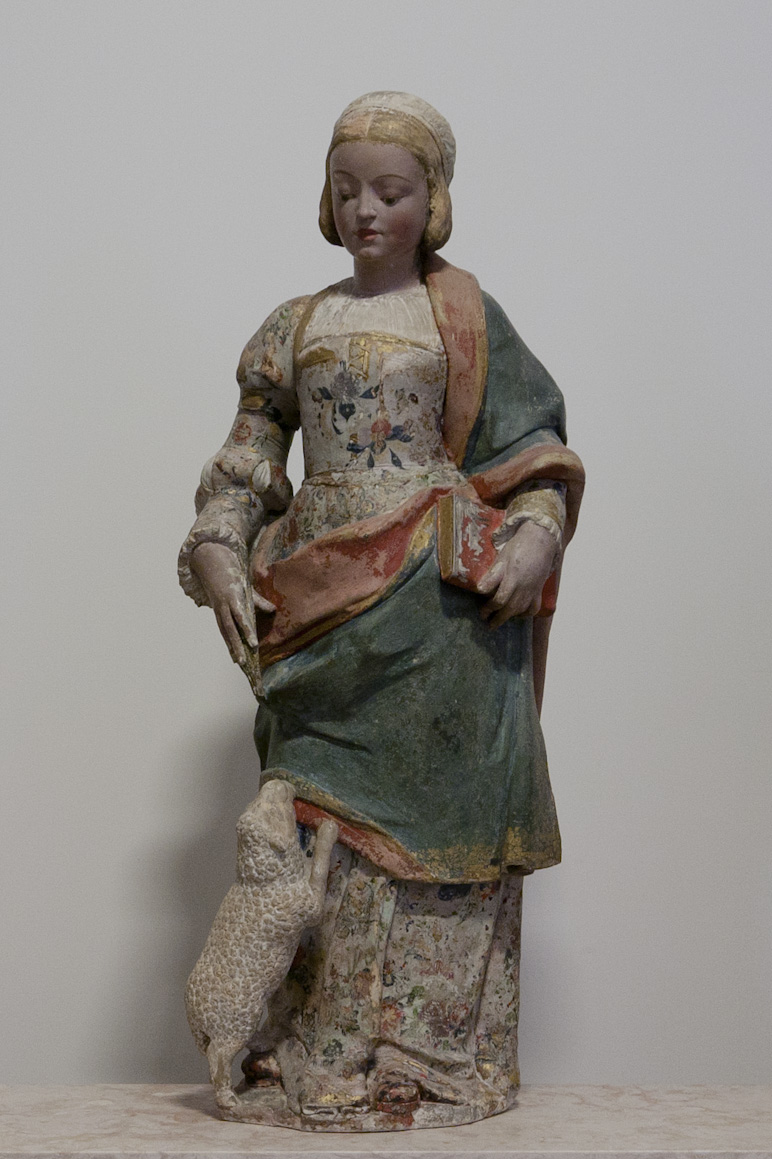
João de Ruão, St. Agnes, 16th Century, 110 x 46 x 25 cm

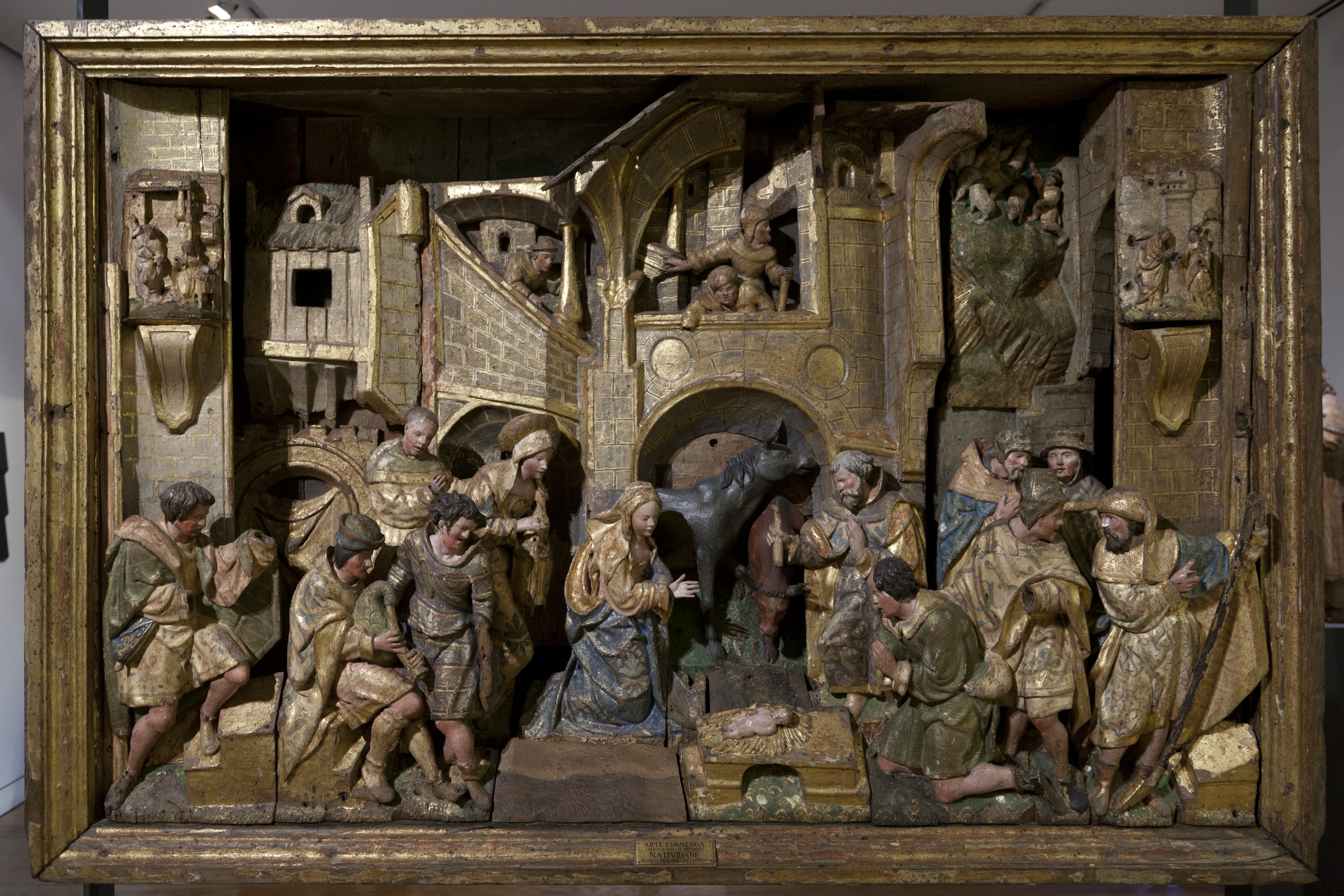
Altarpiece of the Nativity, Antwerp, 16th Century, 106,5 x 162 x 29,5 cm

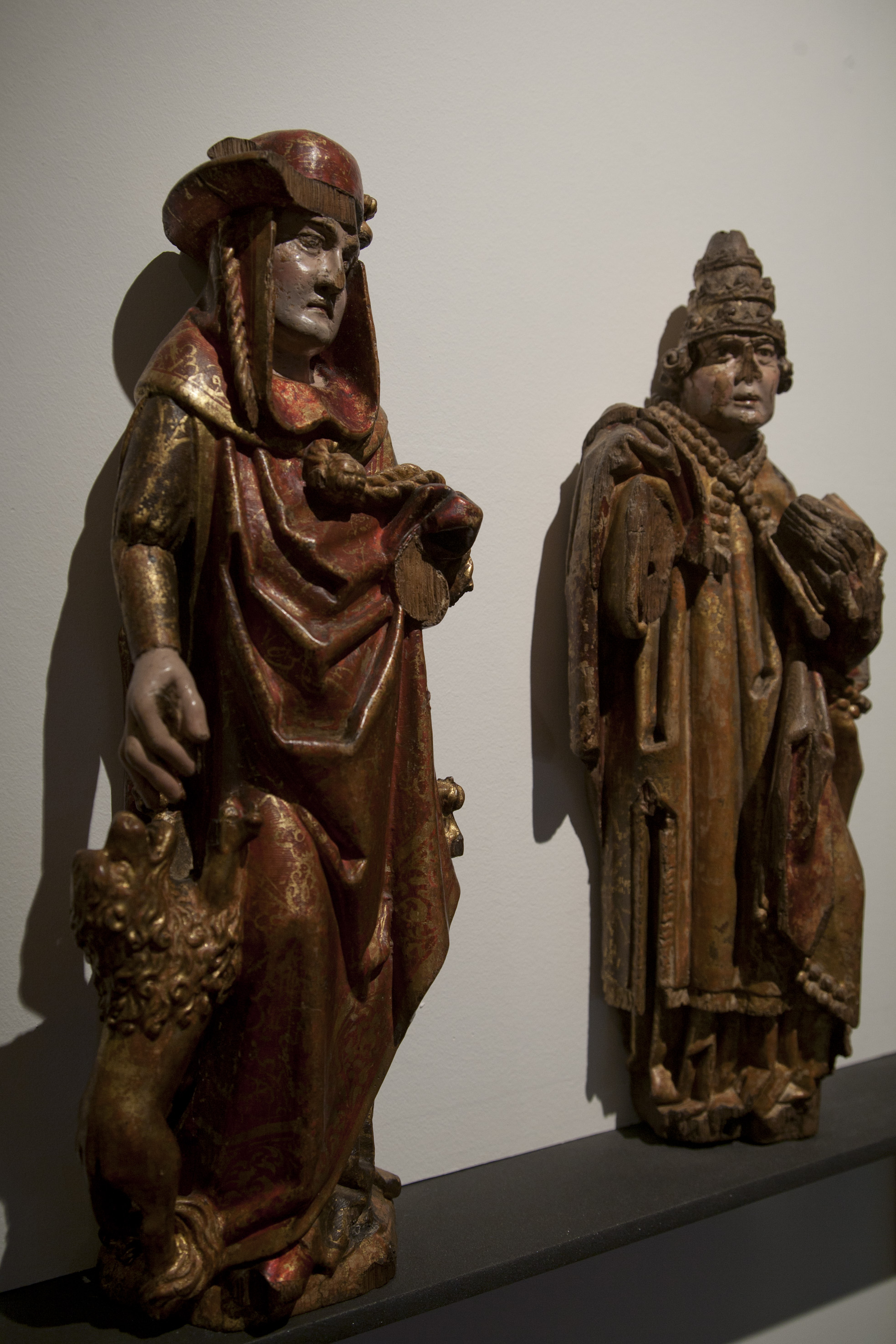
Olivier de Gand, St. Geronimo and Pope St. Gregory, 16th Century

=== Paintings ===
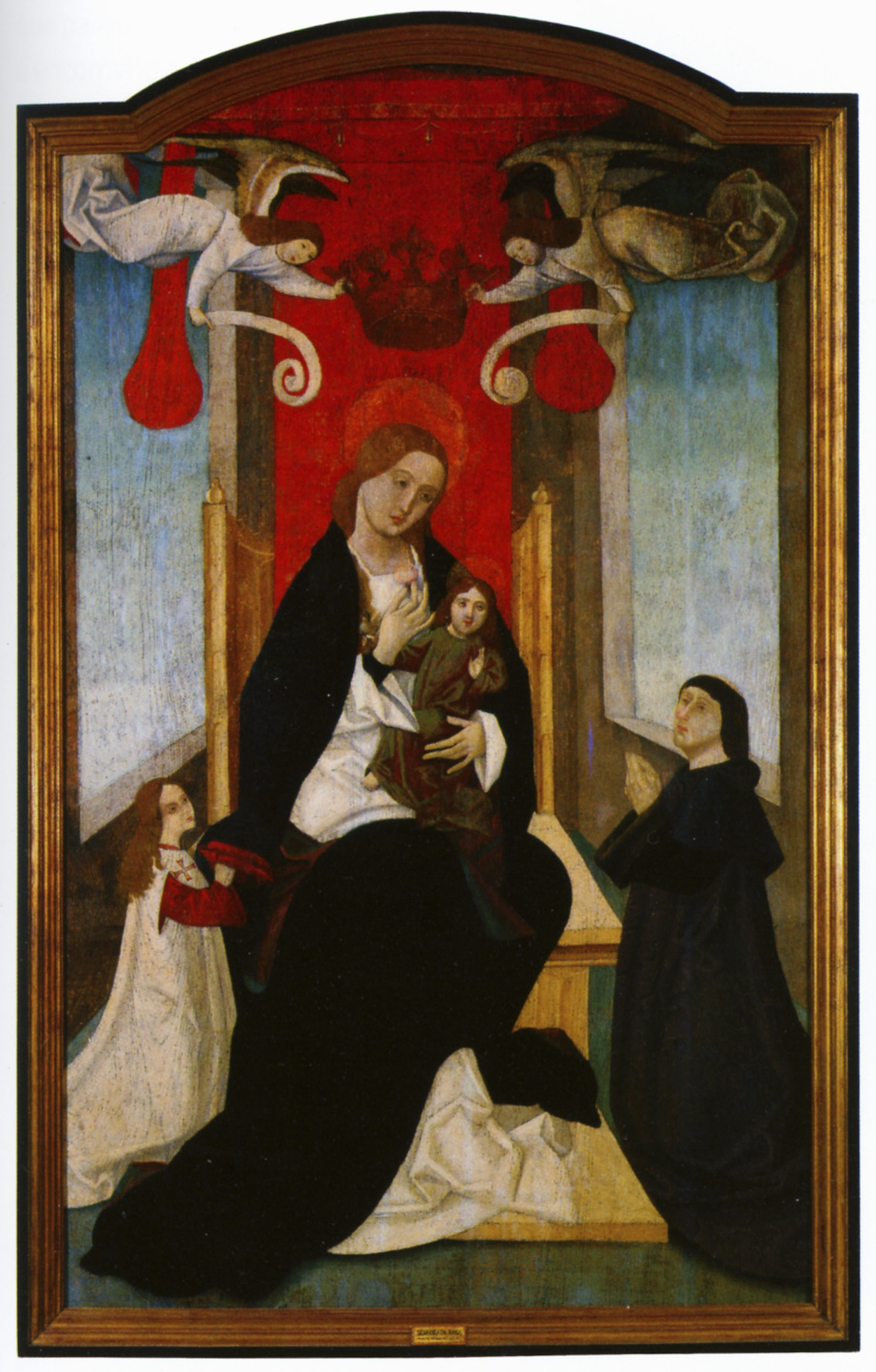
Unknown Author, Madonna of the Rose, 15th Century, 209 x 128 cm

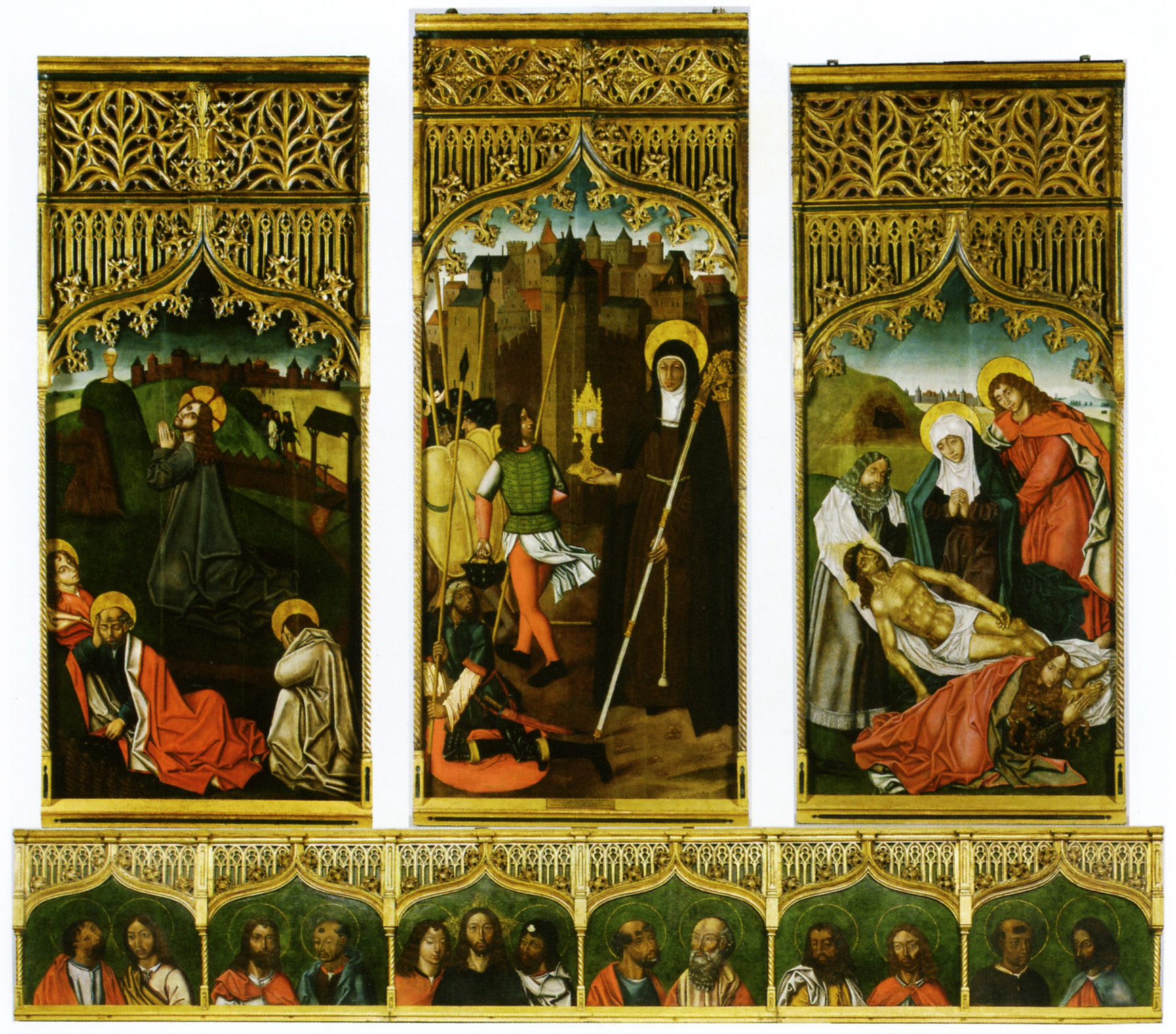
Santa Clara triptych, 16th Century, 297 x 342 cm

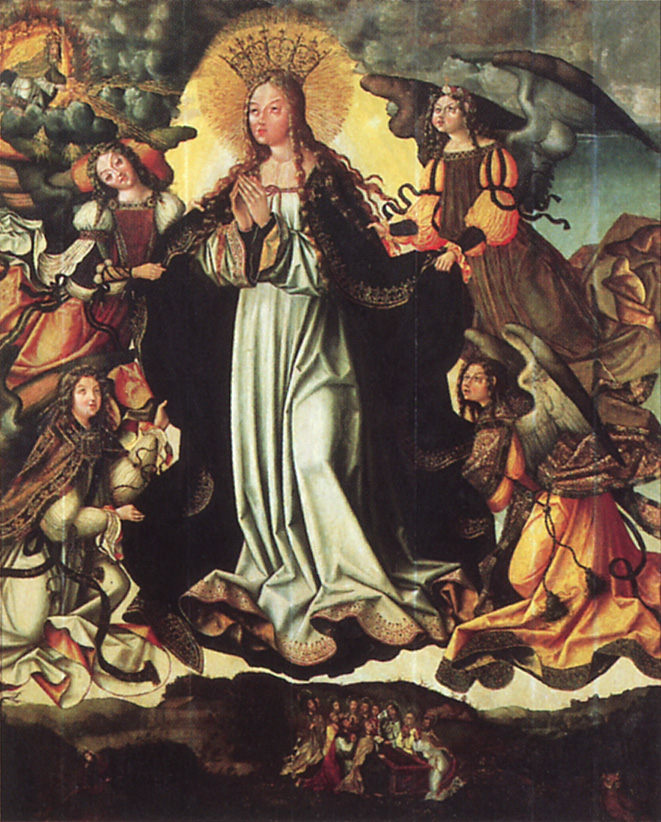
Sardoal Masters, The assumption of the Virgin, 16th Century, 168 x 135 cm

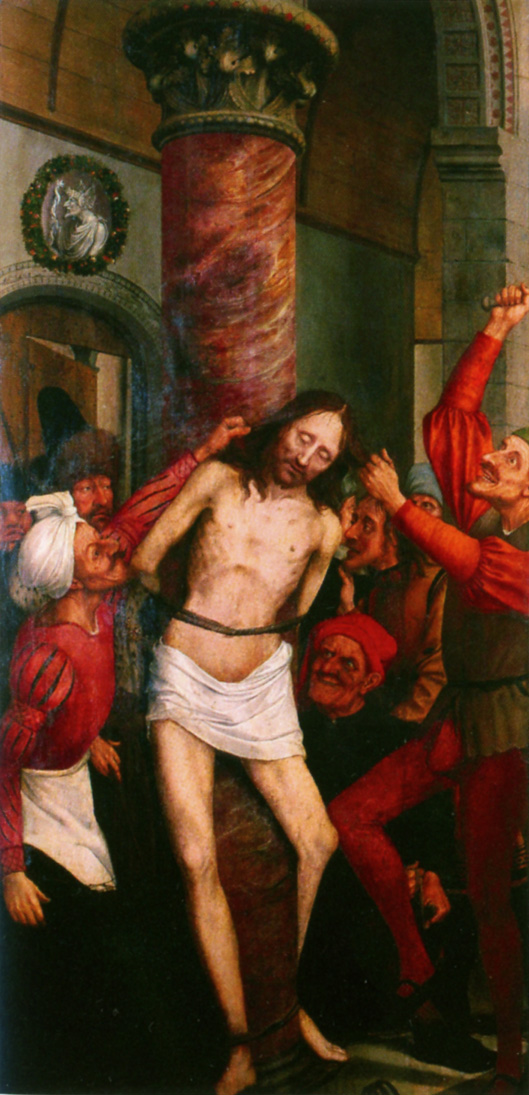
Quentin Metsys, Triptych of the passion of Christ, c. 1514-17

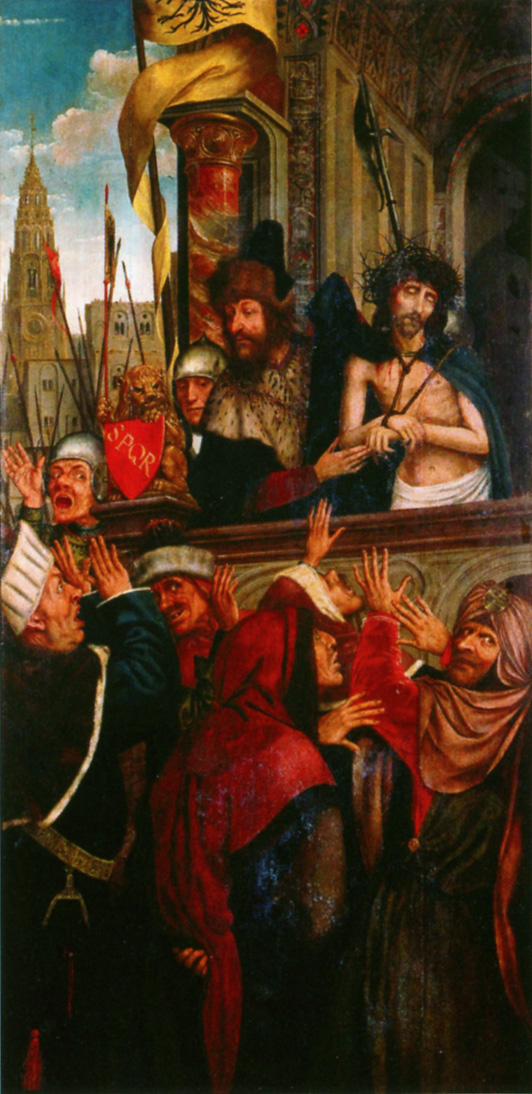
Quentin Metsys, Triptych of the passion of Christ, c. 1514-17

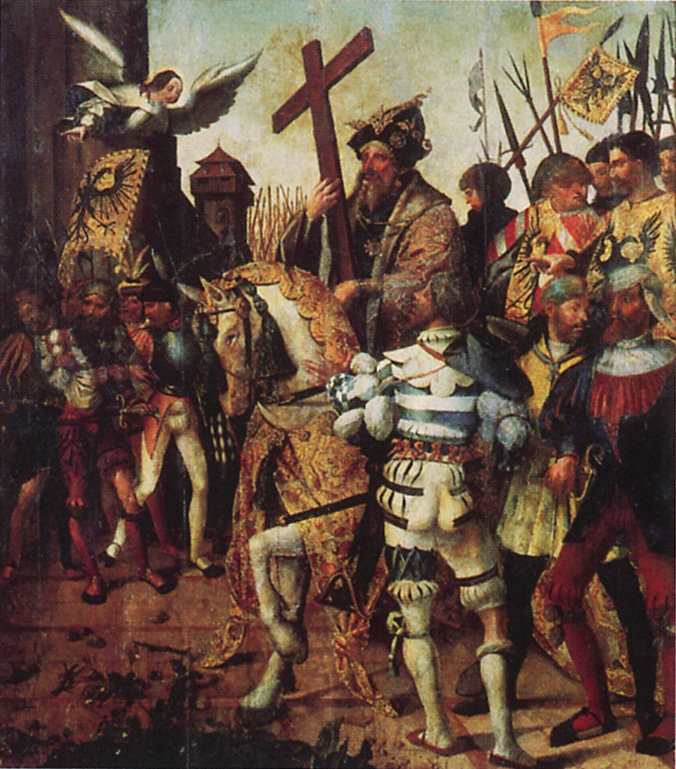
Cristóvão de Figueiredo, Emperor Heraclius with the Holy Cross, 1522-1530

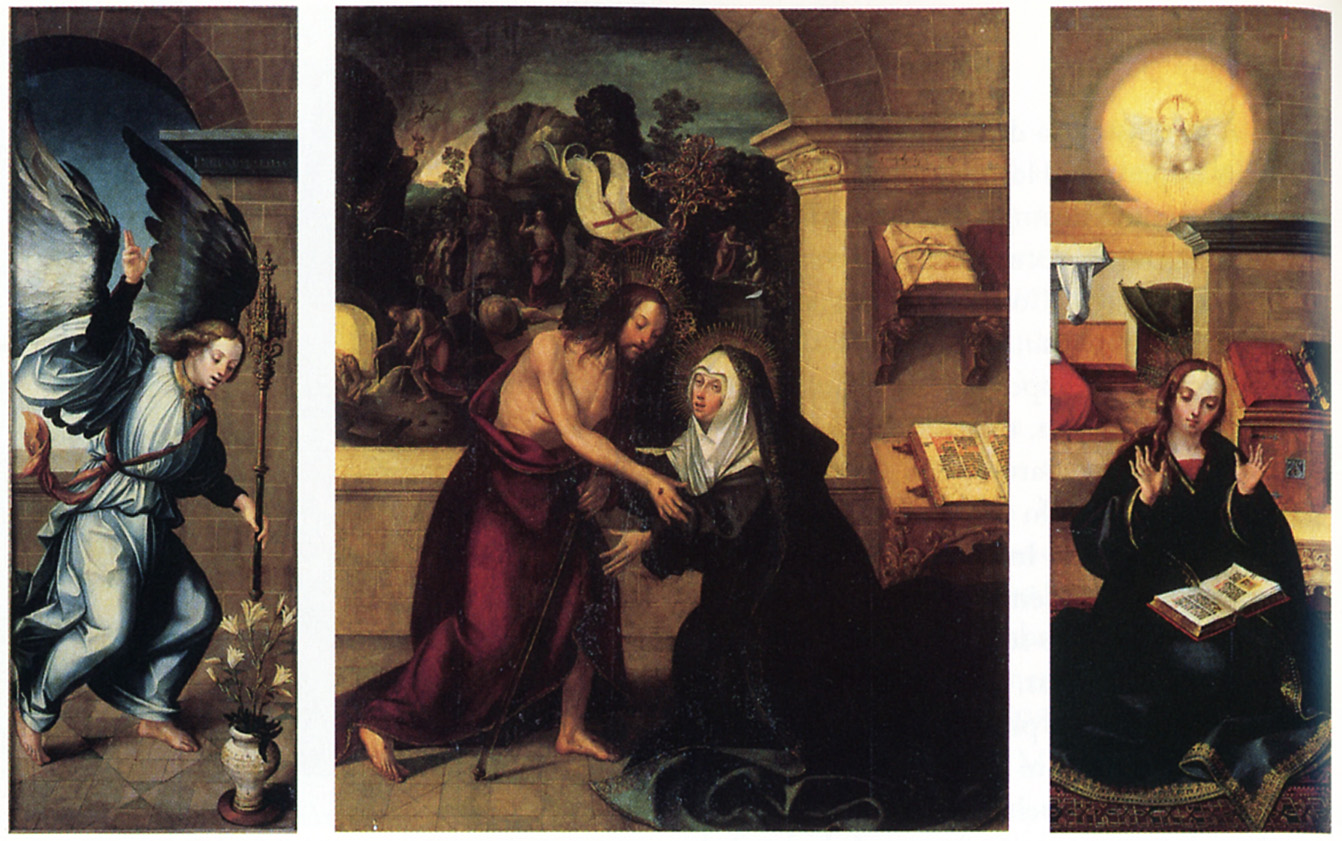
Garcia Fernandes, Triptych of the Apparition of Christ to the Virgin, 1531, 98,5 x 123,5 cm

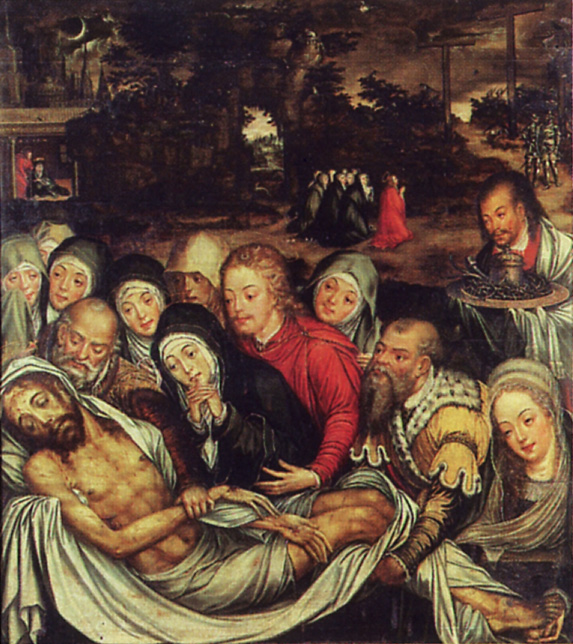
Bernardo Manuel, The Lamentation of Christ, 1570-1580, 178 x 160 cm

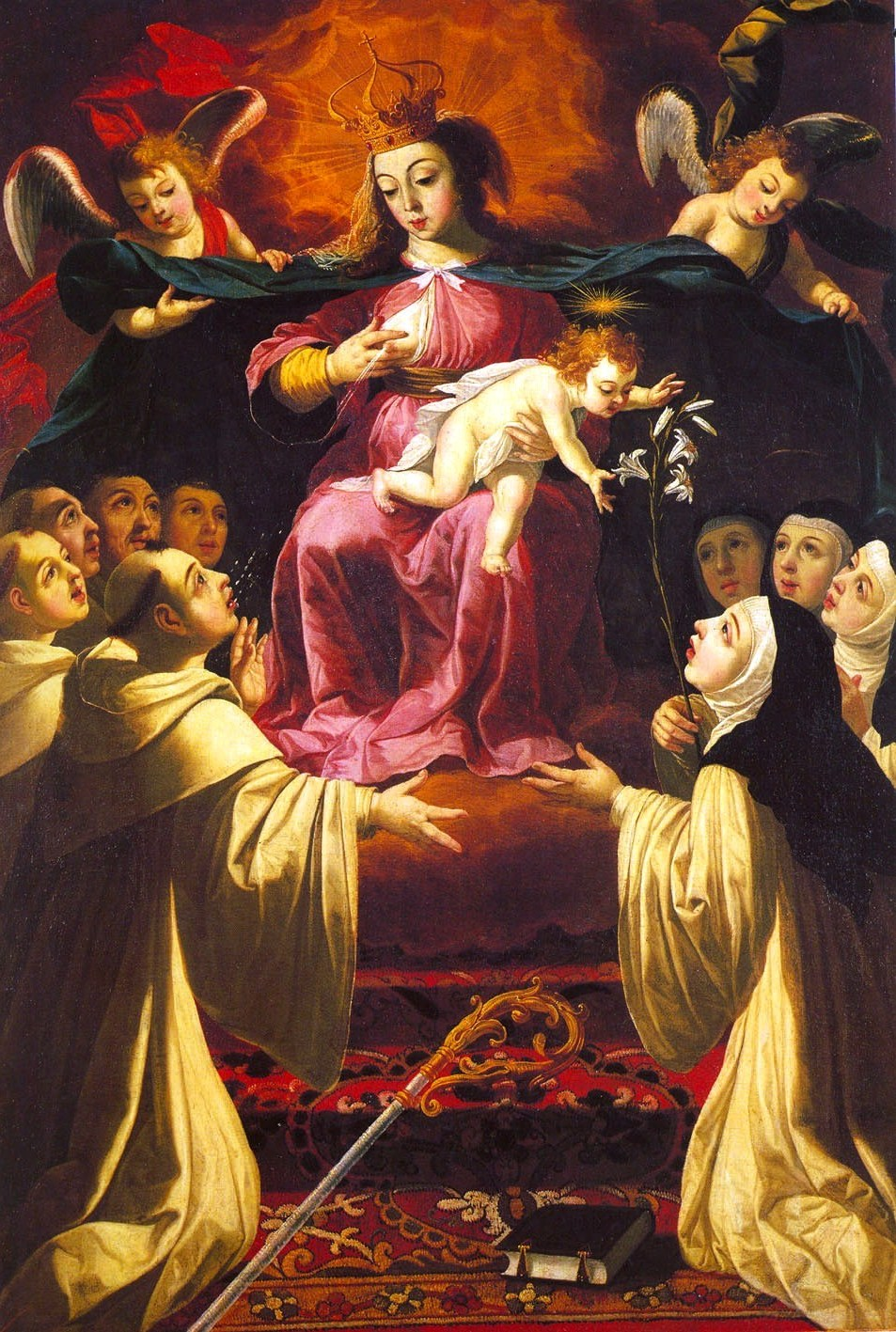
Josefa de Óbidos, The Virgin Breastfeeding Saint Bernard, 1670

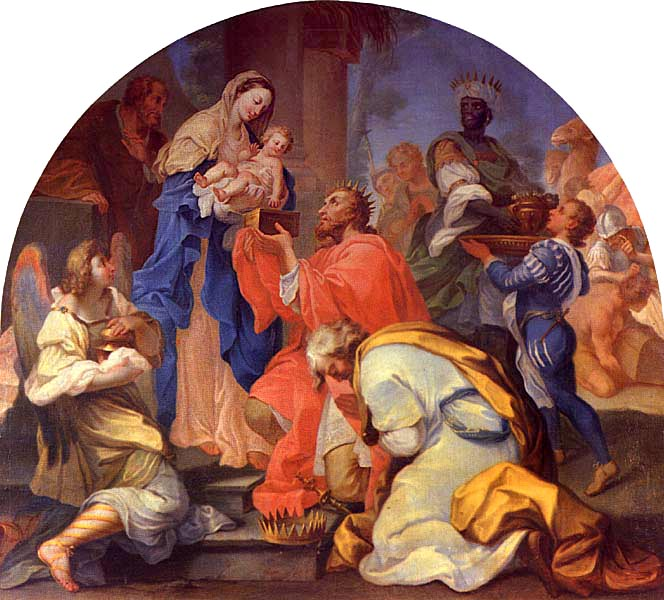
André Gonçalves, Adoration of the Magi, 18th Century

=== Applied arts ===
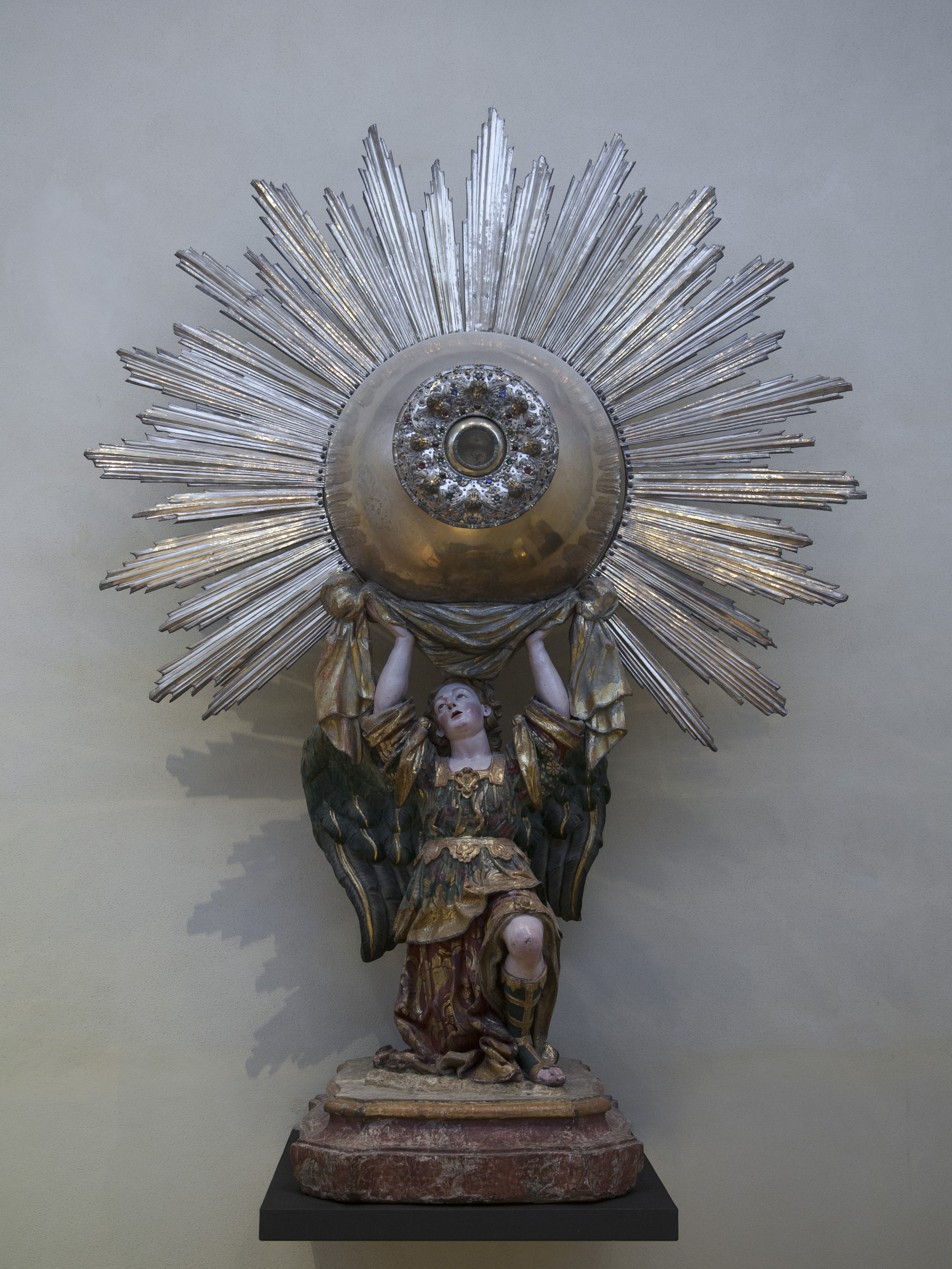
Custódia do Sacramento, 18th Century, 162 x 96 x 99 cm

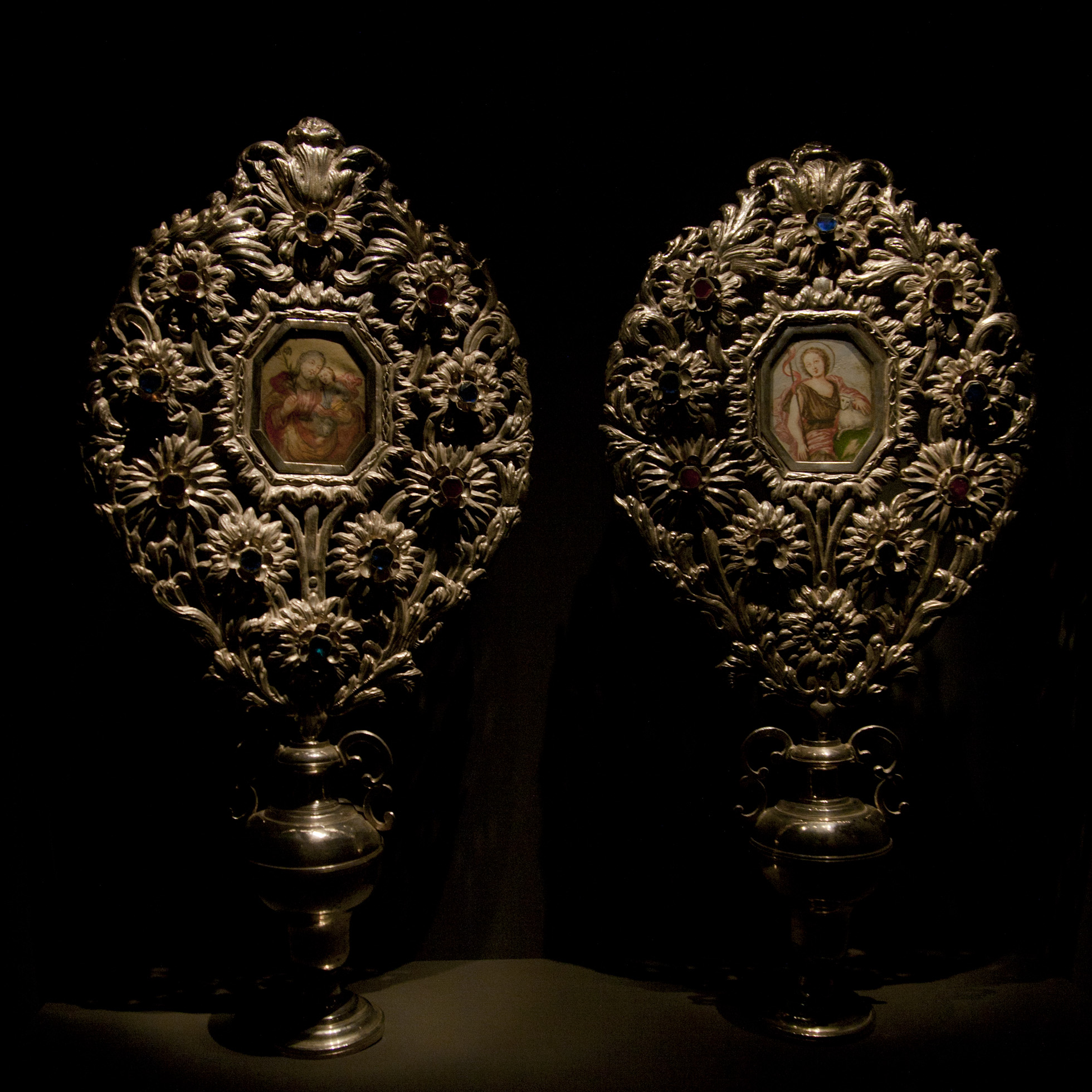
Piece of jewellery

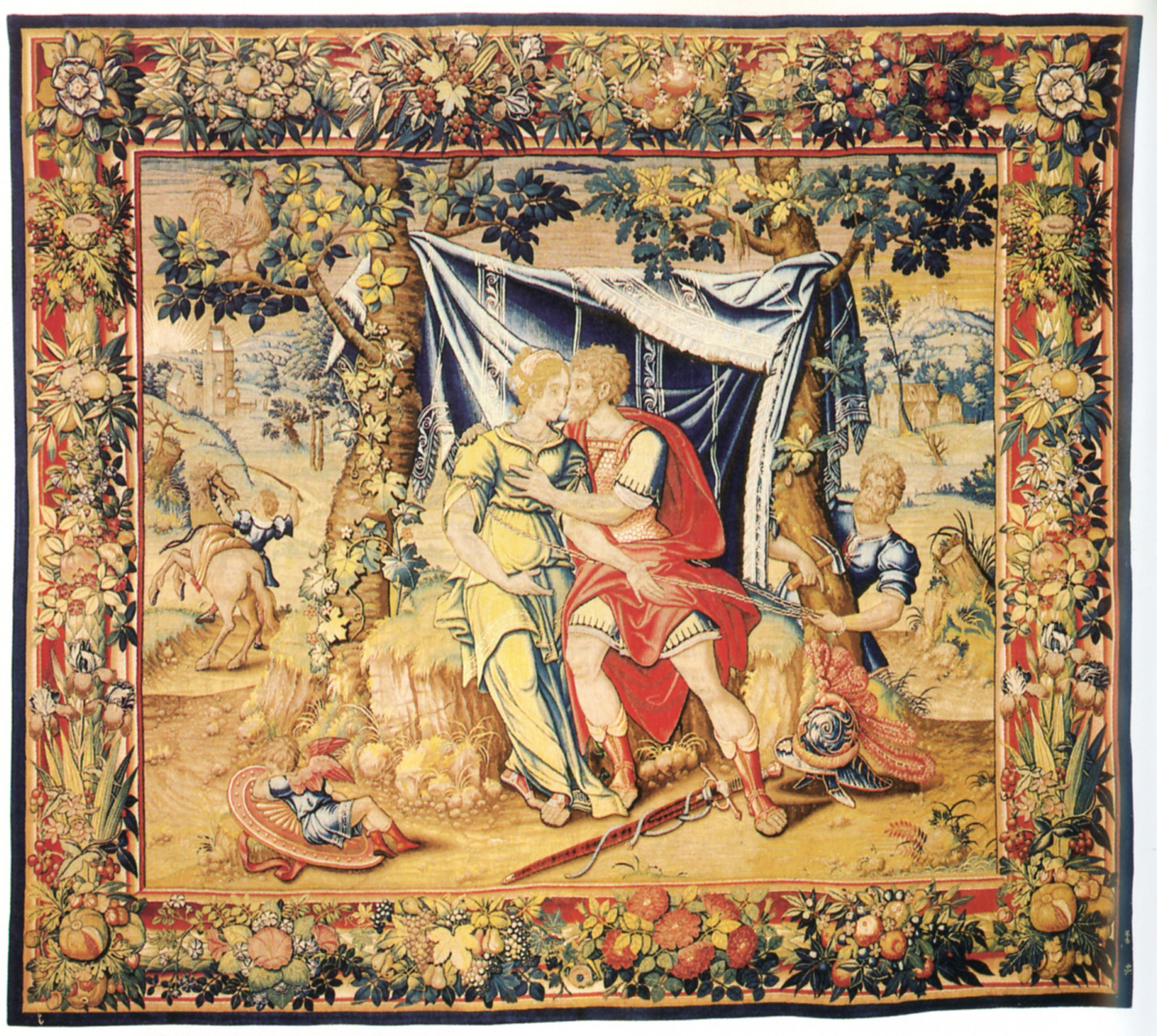
Venus and Mars surprised by Vulcan, tapestry, 16th Century, 360 x 405 cm

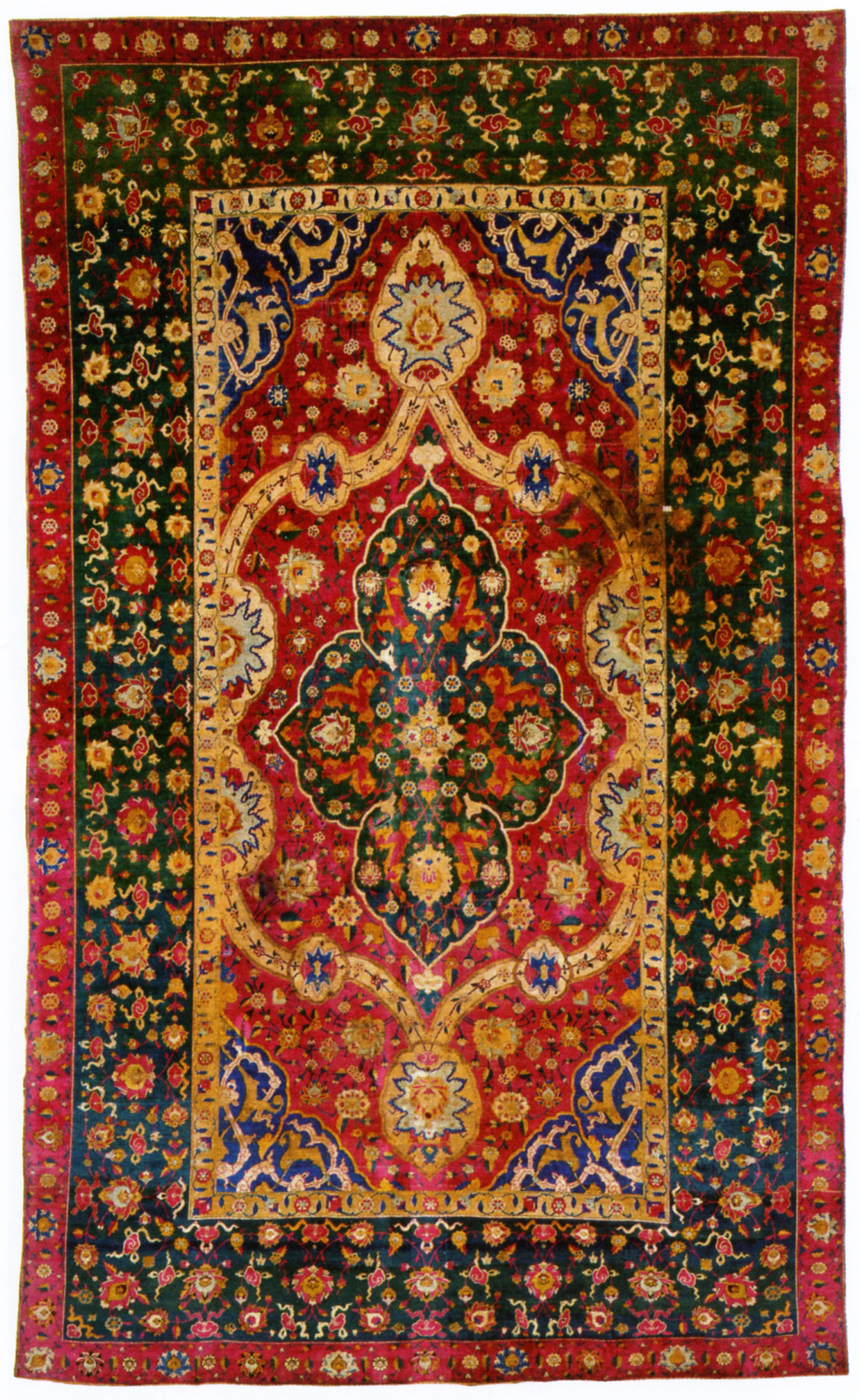
"Kashan" carpet, 16th Century, silk

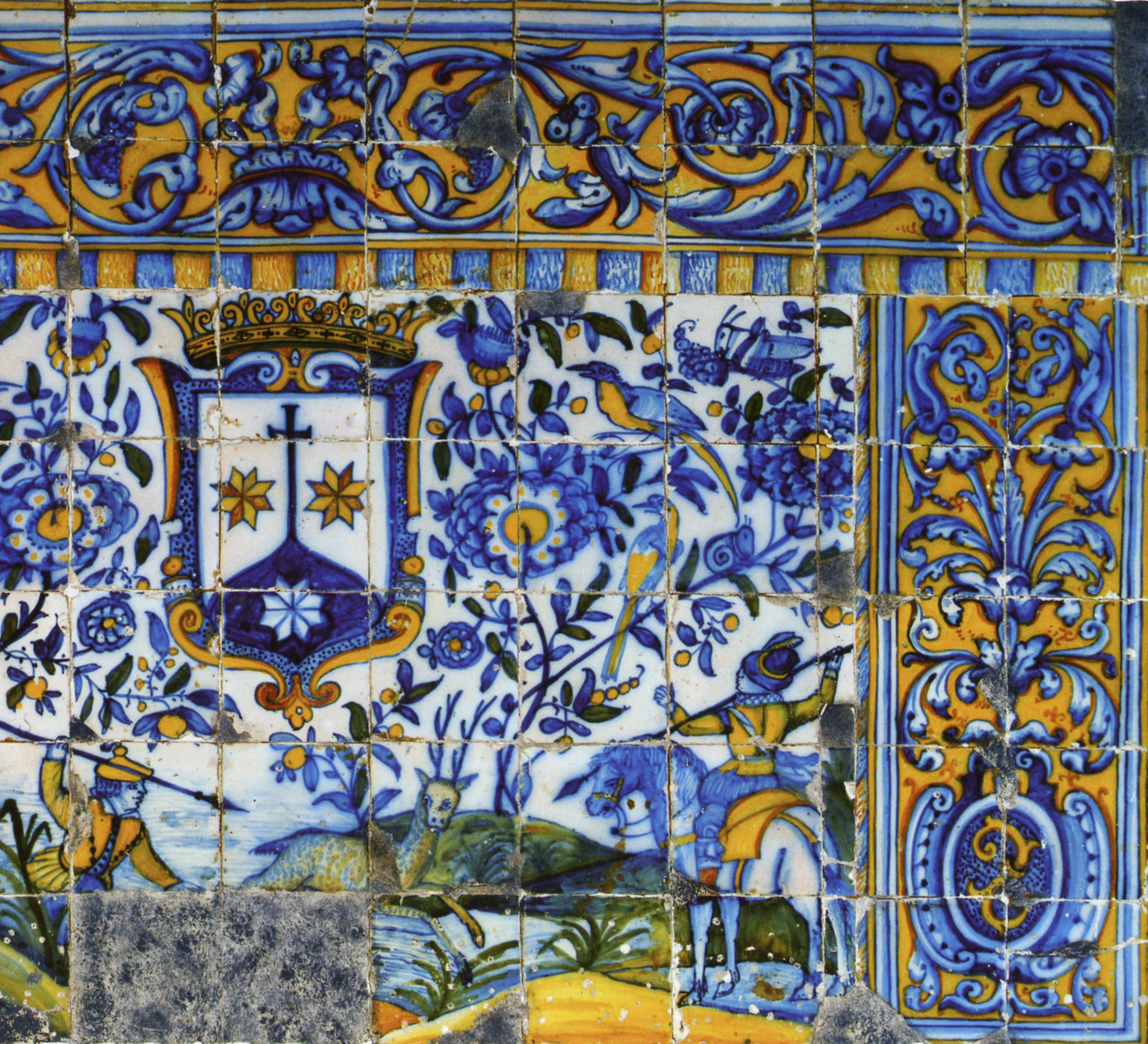
Altar piece, ceramic tiles, c.1670
