= Portuguese Army =

Land forces of the Armed Forces of Portugal

- Exército Português
- Coat of arms of the Portuguese Army
- Founded: 24 October 1147 (879 years, 4 days ago)
- Country: Portugal
- Type: Army
- Role: Land warfare
- Size: Military: 14,000; Civilians: 1,500
- Part of: Portuguese Armed Forces
- Headquarters: Lisbon
- Patron: Afonso I of Portugal (civil); Saint George (religious)
- Mottos: Em perigos e guerras esforçados (English: "Forceful in perils and in battle-post")
- Anniversaries: Battle of São Mamede: 24 June 1128; Battle of Ourique: 25 July 1139; Conquest of Lisbon: 24 October 1147
- Engagements: Military history of Portugal
- Website: exercito.pt

Commanders
- Chief of Staff of the Army: General Eduardo Mendes Ferrão
- Notable commanders: Afonso I of Portugal; Nuno Álvares Pereira; John I of Portugal; Afonso de Albuquerque; Salvador Correia de Sá; Matias de Albuquerque; Marquis of Minas; Joaquim Mouzinho de Albuquerque; Francisco da Costa Gomes; António de Spínola; António Ramalho Eanes Fernando José Salgueiro Maia Jaime Neves

The Portuguese Army (Portuguese: Exército Português) is the land component of the Armed Forces of Portugal and is also its largest branch. It is charged with the defence of Portugal, in co-operation with other branches of the Armed Forces. With its origins going back to the 12th century, it can be considered one of the oldest active armies in the world.

The Portuguese Army is commanded by the Chief of Staff of the Army (CEME), a subordinate of the Chief of the General Staff of the Armed Forces for the operational matters and a direct subordinate of the Ministry of National Defense for all other matters. The CEME is the only officer in the Army with the rank of General (Four-star rank).

Presently, the Portuguese Army is an entirely professional force made of career personnel (officers and NCOs) and of volunteer personnel (officers, NCOs and enlisted ranks). Until the early 1990s, conscripts constituted the bulk of the Army personnel, with a cadre of career officers and NCOs responsible for their training. Conscription was however gradually reduced since the middle 1990s, until being finally formally abolished in 2004.

As 2014, the Portuguese Army employed 5,667 career personnel and 10,444 volunteers, this representing a total of 16,111 military personnel. Of the total military personnel, 2,669 were officers, 3,917 were NCOs and 9,595 were other ranks. Further, the Army also included 1,897 civilian employees.

== Current deployments ==
=== National deployed forces ===
The national deployed forces (Forças Nacionais Destacadas or FND) are units or teams deployed by the Portuguese Armed Forces in foreign missions, mostly in the scope of NATO, the United Nations or the European Union. Currently, the Portuguese Army maintains forces or elements deployed in the following international missions:

NATO

- NATO – tailored Forward Presence (tFP) in Romania
- NATO – enhanced Vigilance Activity (eVA) in Romania
- Multi-National Brigade Slovakia (MNBde SVK) in Slovakia
- Kosovo Force (KFOR) in Kosovo

NATO Mission Iraq (NMI) in Iraq NATO Security Assistance and Training for Ukraine (NSATU) in Germany

EU

- EUTM RCA in Central African Republic
- EUTM-Somalia in Somalia
- European Union Military Assistance Mozambique (EUMAM MOZ) in Mozambique
- European Union Assistance Mission in support of Ukraine (EUMAM-UA) in Poland and in Germany
- Operation ATALANTA in Spain

UN

- Mission multidimensionnelle intégrée des Nations unies pour la stabilisation en Centrafrique MINUSCA in the Central African Republic
- United Nations Verification (UMV) Mission in Colombia

Bilateral/Multilateral

- Coalition of the Willing (CoW) in France

=== Technical-military cooperation ===
The technical-military cooperation (Cooperação Técnico-Militar or CTM, currently designated as "Cooperação no Domínio da Defesa" or CDD) the military missions permanently maintained by Portugal in several members of the Community of Portuguese Language Countries to train and support their national armed forces. Currently, the Portuguese Army maintains elements deployed in the following CTM missions:

- CDD ANG Angola
- CDD CPV Cape Verde
- CDD GNB Guinea-Bissau
- CDD MOZ Mozambique
- CDD STP São Tomé and Príncipe
- CDD TLS Timor-Leste

== History ==
The Portuguese Army has a long history, directly connected to the history of Portugal since its early beginnings.

=== Middle Ages ===
The Portuguese Army has its remote origins in the military forces of the County of Portugal that allowed its ruler, Afonso Henriques, to obtain its independence from the Kingdom of León and to enlarge its territory in the 12th century. The victory of the Portuguese forces in the Battle of São Mamede, on 24 June 1128, is considered the seminal event for the foundation of an independent Portugal, leading to Afonso Henriques to style himself as Prince.

The Portuguese forces were also involved in the Reconquista, successively advancing south to reconquer territories occupied by the Moors and expand the territory of Portugal. On 25 July 1139, the Portuguese troops obtain a spectacular victory over five Moorish kings in the Battle of Ourique, after its end proclaiming Afonso Henriques as King of the Portuguese.

Under the Treaty of Zamora, signed on 5 October 1143, Portugal was officially recognized as an independent Kingdom.

In 1147, an important step in the Reconquista is done, with the conquest of the city of Lisbon to the moors. The Portuguese part of the Reconquista would finally come to an end in 1249, with the complete recapture of the Algarve.

The Portuguese ground forces of that time were initially formed by military contingents provided by the landlords (lords of the manors and of the Church), called the mesnadas. Later, to these were added the knights of the military orders (initially the Knights Templars and later also the knights of the Hospital, of Saint James of the Sword and of Aviz) and the knights of the border towns. These contingents were collectively referred as the Hoste, which was under the supreme command of the Monarch, but who often delegated his command in the Alferes-Mor (High Standard-bearer). These forces also included bands of irregular riders (latrones) of some warlords, which attacked the moor fortresses by surprise, usually taken advante of the night or of the bad weather. Occasionally, for certain military campaigns, like the siege of Lisbon, the Portuguese forces were reinforced by Crusaders from the Northern Europe, who happened to be passing by the Portuguese coasts, on their way to the Holy Land. With the resettling of the territories conquered to the Moors and the establishment of new towns and municipalities, these increased their contribution of municipal contingents of horse (cavaleiros vilãos) and foot troops. The municipal military service was regulated, with the establishment of a defensive service (apelido), an offensive service (fossado) and the possibility of the replacement of the presential military service by the payment of special taxes (fossadeira).

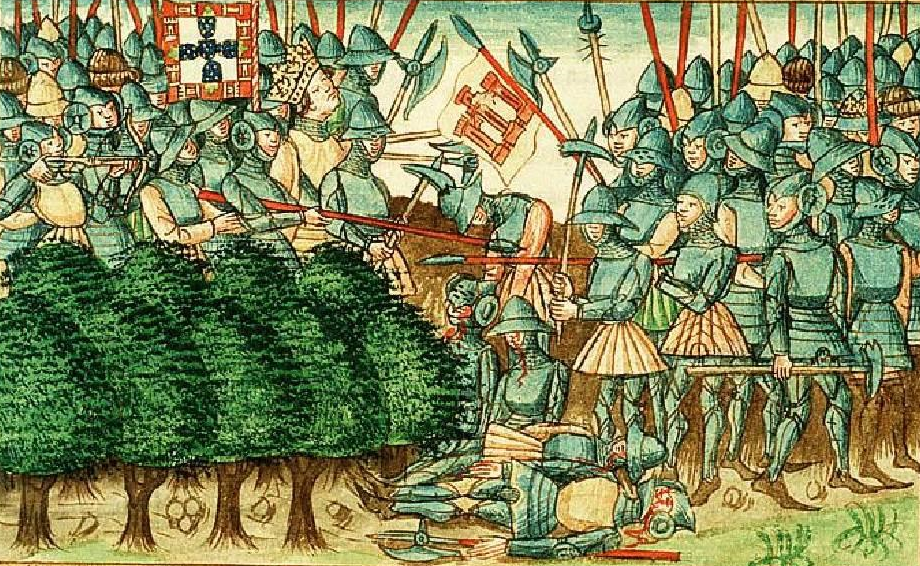
Portuguese victory at the Battle of Aljubarrota

In the 14th century, the Portuguese troops defeated Castilian invaders, obtaining a definitive victory in the Battle of Aljubarrota in 1385. With the independence guaranteed, Portugal then began its worldwide overseas expansion, starting by the conquest of Ceuta in North Africa in 1415.

Organization of the Portuguese military developed during the Middle Ages, leading to a more complex structure and the consequent creation of new command offices. Thus, in 1383, the office of Constable of Portugal was created, replacing the Alferes-Mor as the head of the military. The Constable was assisted by the Marshal of Portugal.

Other Portuguese important military offices that existed were those of fronteiro-mor (theatre commander of the forces operating in a province), of Coudel-Mor (superintendent of the cavalry) and of Anadel-Mor (superintendent of the shooters). The Anadel-Mor, by himself, superintended the commanders (anadéis) of the king's crossbowmen, of the horse crossbowmen and of the municipal crossbowmen.

=== Overseas expansion ===
With the start of the maritime expansion of Portugal in the 15th century, the country's land forces focused on overseas campaigns intended to conquer new territories in Africa, Asia and the Americas, that would form the Portuguese Empire. Among these many campaigns were the wars for the control of Morocco, the wars with the Ottoman Empire for the control of India and the Indian Ocean, the war with the Persian Empire for the control of the Persian Gulf and participation in the Abyssinian–Adal war in support of the Ethiopian Empire. The role of the ground forces was more important in the campaigns of Morocco, that were fought mainly on land. A great part of the other overseas campaigns occurred at sea and so were led by the Portuguese Navy, but the ground forces had also an important role as boarding forces during naval battles and as landing forces in amphibious operations. In Europe, Portuguese ground forces engaged in the War of the Castilian Succession.

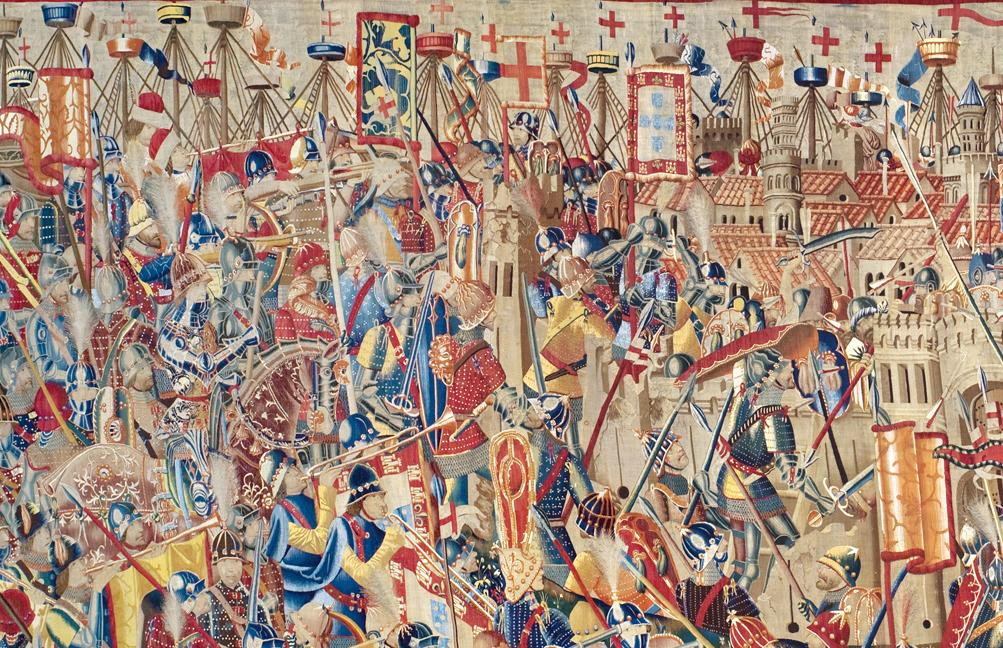
The Portuguese forces, personally commanded by King Afonso V, in the conquest of Asilah, Morocco

Reflecting the importance of the artillery, in 1449, the role of Vedor-Mor da Artilharia (Superintendent of the Artillery) is established by King Afonso V, with the responsibility for the procurement and conservation of the artillery.

After a number of previous failed attempts, King Sebastian established the foundations of a standing army, with the creation of the Ordenanças in 1570. The Ordenanças was a militia-type territorial organization aimed to provide a military framework for the Portuguese population and to create a nationwide standardized system of military training and mobilization. It was organized into 250-man companies, each headed by a captain, assisted by an alferes (ensign) and a sergeant. The several Ordenanças companies of a city, town or municipality were grouped into captaincies, each headed by a captain-major, assisted by a sergeant-major. The Ordenanças system would cover virtually all available manpower of Portugal and become part of the basis of the Portuguese military organization until the 19th century. Its efficiency would soon be evidenced by its important contribution to the raising of the expeditionary army that would fight the 1578 Moroccan campaign.

During the reign of Sebastian, Portuguese land forces also adopted the terço (modeled after the Spanish tercio) as its main infantry formation. In 1578, for the Moroccan campaign, four provincial terços were raised through the Ordenanças system, another one was drawn from young nobles volunteers and a further three were made up of foreign mercenaries. Each of these terços was made of 12 companies and around 3000 men (pikemen, arquebusiers and musketeers), under the command of a colonel. In respect of the Portuguese cavalry of the time, it included the acorbetados (heavy armored cavalry) and the ginetes (light cavalry).

The advanced organization of the Portuguese forces, however, was not sufficient to avoid the disastrous defeat at the Battle of Alcácer Quibir with the death of the young and childless King Sebastian. His death soon led to the takeover of the Portuguese Crown by Philip II of Spain in 1580, consolidated after the defeat of the Portuguese resistance, led by António of Portugal, in the War of the Portuguese Succession. These events originated the 60-year-long Iberian Union, period in which the interests of Portugal became subordinated to those of Spain, causing a sharp decline in its economical, political and social might.

=== Restoration War ===
With Portugal subject to the Spanish kings, the early 17th century was a period of neglect of the Portuguese military. Portuguese forces were mobilized to fight for Spain in its campaigns in several theatres. By contrast, almost no military support was received from Spain for the defense of the Portuguese Empire, which came under successive attacks by Spain's enemies, in particular the English and the Dutch. As a result, Portugal suffered a series of military set backs, losing several territories in Africa, in Asia and in America.

On 1 December 1640, the Portuguese revolted and restored their full independence, under the leadership of the Duke of Braganza, who was crowned as King John IV of Portugal. The Portuguese Restoration War then started, with the Portuguese Army defeating the Spanish Army in a series of military campaigns, until achieving the final victory in 1668. At the same time, the Portuguese defeated the Dutch in a series of overseas campaigns, recovering most of its territories in Africa and South America.

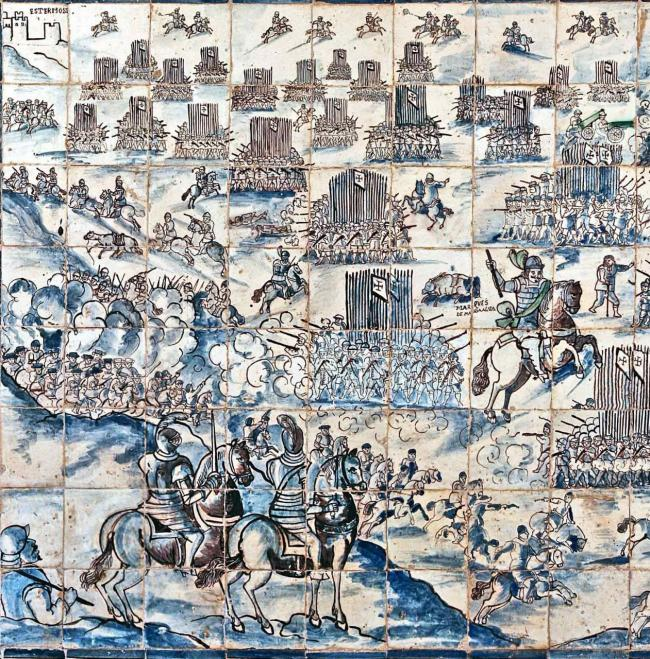
Partial depiction of the Battle of Montes Claros in a 17th-century azulejo panel at the Palace of Fronteira

At the moment of the Restoration of Portuguese independence, the country's ground forces were reduced to around 2000 ill-equipped men. The Ordenanças had been neglected and virtually disappeared. A new military organization had then to be built. By this time, ground forces started to be referred to as the Exército (Army). The high command structure of the new military organization had a Council of War (Conselho de Guerra) as the supreme military body of the country. The Monarch delegated most of his military roles in this council, including the responsibility for military organization, commission of officers, military operations planning, building of fortifications and military justice. The role of Captain-General of the Arms of the Kingdom was created to serve as the commander-in-chief of the Army, at the same time presiding over the Council of War. Under the Captain-General, there was a military territorial organization that included a general officer governor of arms for each of the six provinces (Entre-Douro e Minho, Trás-os-Montes, Beira, Estremadura, Alentejo and Algarve) and under them, a military governor for each of the 25 comarcas.

This system of forces – approved by the Portuguese Cortes (Parliament) in 1642 – had one of the most advanced organizations of the time, including three lines or classes of troops. The organization of the forces established at this time would remain almost unchanged until the disbandment of the Army in 1837, after the end of the Civil War.

The first line was made up of the paid troops (professional troops), which included terços of infantry and independent companies of horse (cuirassiers and carabineers). The paid infantry soldiers were recruited among the cadet sons of all classes, except orphans and farmers, while the soldiers of horse were recruited only among the cadet sons of the nobles, and usually volunteered to serve for six years. The officers were all recruited among the nobles. Initially, 10 paid terços were raised, besides the already existing terço of the Navy. With the course of the war, additional paid terços were raised, with the number fixed at 20, after the end of the conflict. The terços were the equivalent of the regiments of most of the non-Iberian European armies. Each terço was commanded by a mestre de campo (equivalent to colonel), assisted by a sergeant-major and a staff, with 10 companies and around 2000 men (pikemen, arquebusiers and musketeers). Despite the existence of plans for the creation of regiments of horse, grouping several companies of horse, these were never implemented and these companies continued to be independent units through the duration of the war. However, for merely tactical purposes, the companies of horse were occasionally grouped in temporary formations (troços), each under the command of a commissioner general (senior officer of cavalry).

The second line was made up of the auxiliary troops that formed the reserve of the Army, being able to assume the same role as the troops of the first line, if necessary. The soldiers of the auxiliary troops were recruited among the orphans, farmers and married men, these only being paid if engaged in campaign. Its officers were taken from the paid troops. Initially, the auxiliary troops were organized in independent companies, several of which were grouped under the command of each of the 25 military governors of comarca. In 1661, the role of governor of comarca was disbanded, with the companies of auxiliary troops being grouped into 25 auxiliary terços.

Finally, the third line was made up of the rebuilt Ordenanças. These were intended to include all the eligible men of the country, serving as a recruitment depot to provide men to the first and second lines of the army. Besides the role of recruitment depots, its units could occasionally be actively employed in the garrison of fortresses or in local defense roles. The Ordenanças continued to follow the organization established by King Sebastian, with their basic units being the companies of 250 men, grouped in captaincies. In the city of Lisbon, whose inhabitants were exempt from being draft for the auxiliary troops, the Ordenanças had a special organization, constituting five terços commanded by colonels.

The Restoration War also obliged the incorporation of foreign troops into the Army. In 1641, these included eight French regiments (five of light cavalry, one of carabineers, one of dragoons and the other of infantry), two Dutch cavalry regiments, one Irish infantry regiment, one Scottish infantry regiment and one Italian infantry regiment.

Military forces were also organized in the overseas territories of Portugal, especially in Brazil, where the European Portuguese military organization with three classes of troops was replicated, although with local adaptations. In Brazil, terços of whites, Native Americans and blacks were raised. The Brazilian colonial forces successfully defeated and expelled the Dutch invaders not only from Brazil, but also constituted the bulk of the expedition to Africa that expelled the Dutch from São Tomé Island and from Angola, restoring Portuguese sovereignty in those territories.

=== Ancien Régime ===
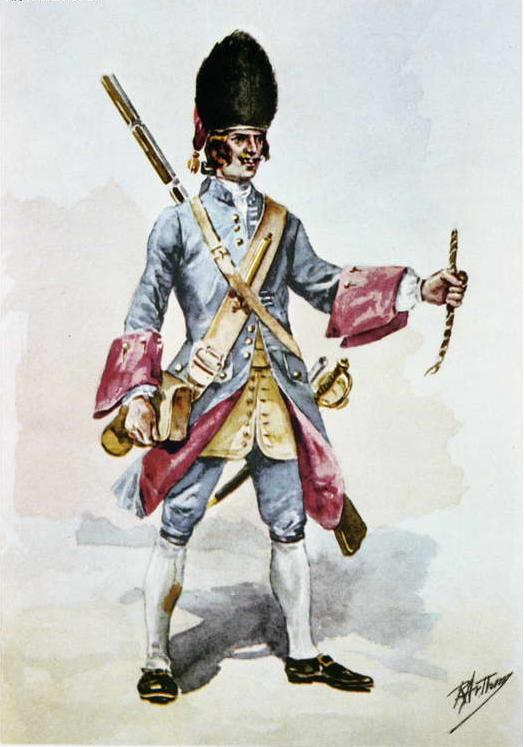
A Portuguese Army grenadier in 1740

In the early 18th century, the Portuguese Army participated in the War of the Spanish Succession on the side of the Grand Alliance forces. In the middle of the century, it took part in the Seven Years' War, fighting the Spanish in the European theater (Iberian Peninsula) and in the South American theater.

In 1707, with the Portuguese Army engaged in the War of the Spanish Succession, King John V decreed a reform of the military organization. Within the scope of this reform, the paid terços were transformed in infantry regiments, with the designation of their commanding officers changed from mestres de campo to colonels. The change of designations was mainly done to match the names of the Portuguese units and military ranks with those of the foreign allied armies, following the standard designations used in most of Europe. By this time, each infantry regiment was tactically organized as single battalion, with a staff and 12 companies, one of these being of grenadiers. The new military organization also presaged the creation of regiments of cavalry and dragoons. Artillery regiments would also be formed later. The regiments of infantry, cavalry and dragoons were grouped in brigades, each under the command of a brigadier. The auxiliary terços however remained with the same designation and organization until 1796, when these followed the model of the infantry of the line, being transformed into militia regiments.

In the scope of the Fantastic War, the Army increased in size with the inclusion of two battalions of Swiss troops (latter merged into a single foreign regiment) and the raising of a regiment of light troops of infantry and cavalry. William, Count of Schaumburg-Lippe was appointed to the new rank of Field Marshal General (Marechal-General) to command the Army in that campaign and, at the same time, to reorganize it. With the end of the War, the Army was again reduced. By 1764, the first line of the Army included 27 infantry regiments (three of them permanently deployed in Brazil), 10 regiments of cavalry, two regiments of dragoons, four regiments of artillery, one regiment of foreign infantry (the Royal Foreigners Regiment) and one regiment of light troops (the Royal Volunteers Regiment). Additionally, there were two regiments of infantry of the Navy. Each of these regiments (with exception of the foreign regiment) corresponded to a specific district from where their soldiers were recruited.

In 1790, Queen Maria I decreed the creation of the Academia Real de Fortificação, Artilharia e Desenho (Royal Academy of Fortification, Artillery and Drawing), in Lisbon, for the higher education and training of the Army officers. The main purpose of this Academy was the training of engineer officers, but it also the trained officers of the other branches of the Army. It replaced a number of previous military academies that had existed since the 17th century, being the direct ancestor of the present Portuguese Military Academy.

Besides the Army in Europe, the armies of the Crown of Portugal also included military forces and garrisons in the Portuguese Overseas territories. These forces formed separate organizations subordinated to the local Portuguese Viceroys and governors, who, as military commanders, had also the title of captains-generals. In the late 18th century, the larger contingents of first line troops were in Brazil (12 infantry regiments, three infantry regiments deployed from Portugal, three artillery regiments, one dragoon regiment, one cavalry regiment, the Viceroy Cavalry Guard and a Legion of Light Troops), in India (two infantry regiments, one artillery regiment, one cavalry regiment and two legions of sepoys) and in Angola (an infantry regiment, an artillery regiment and a cavalry regiment). Since the 17th century, several military academies had been established in several parts of the Overseas for the training of the members of the local military forces. In 1792, the Real Academia de Artilharia, Fortificação e Desenho (Royal Academy of Artillery, Fortification and Drawing) was established in Rio de Janeiro – on the exact model of the Royal Academy of Fortification of Lisbon – for the training of the officers of the Army in Brazil, this being considered the oldest engineering school of the Americas.

=== Peninsular War ===
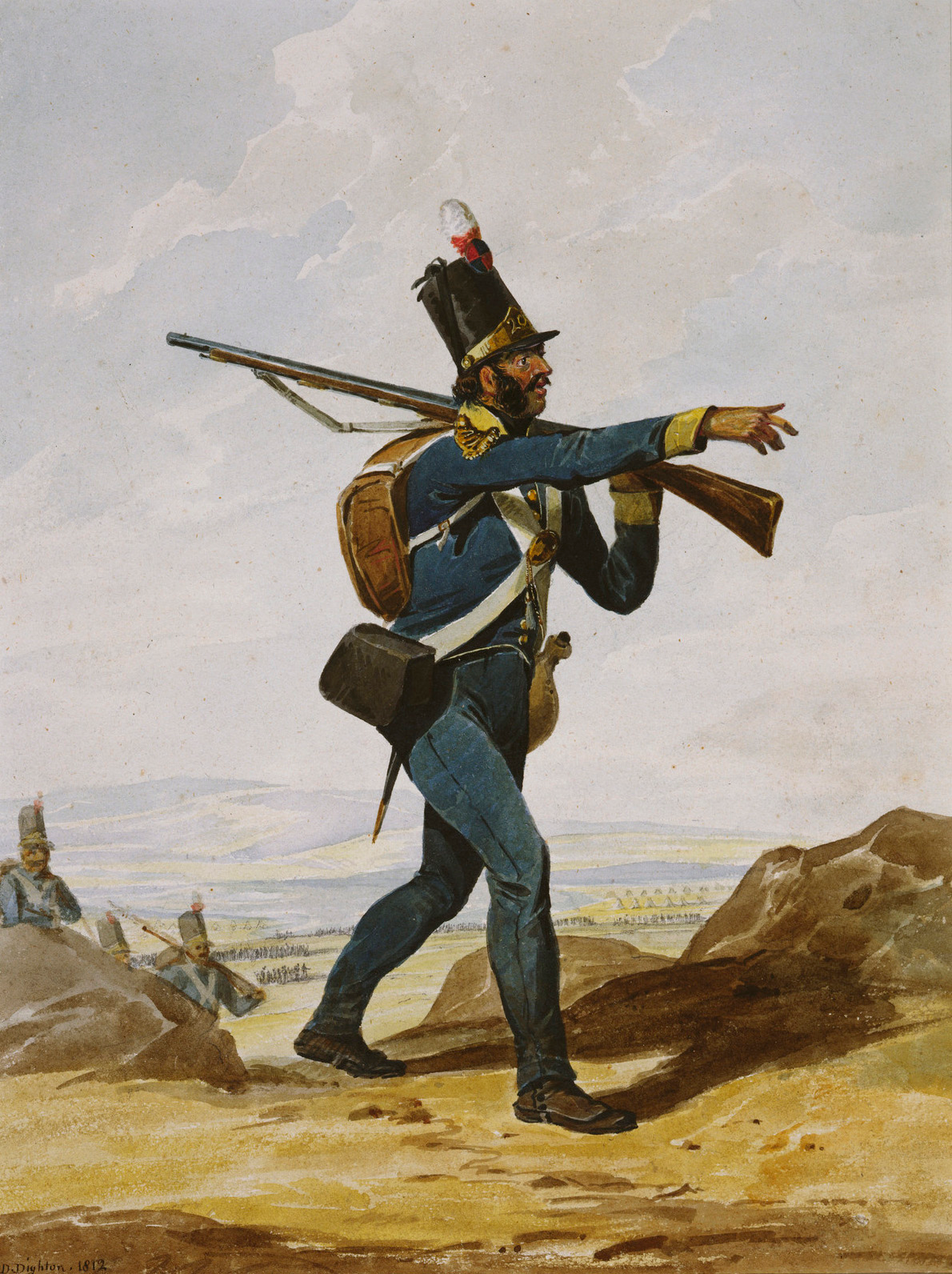
A soldier of the Portuguese Army's 20th Infantry Regiment in 1812

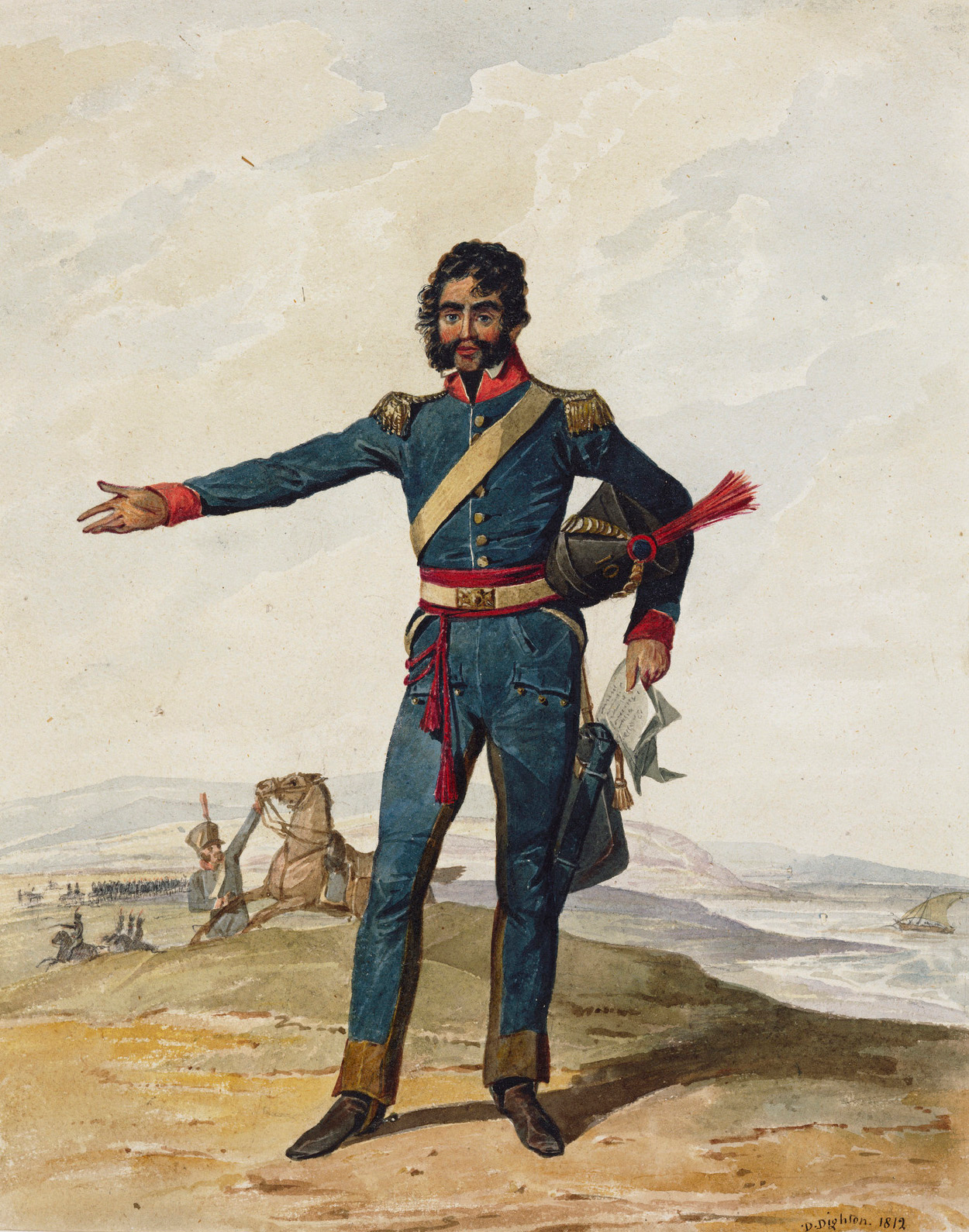
An officer of the Portuguese Army's 10th Cavalry Regiment in 1812

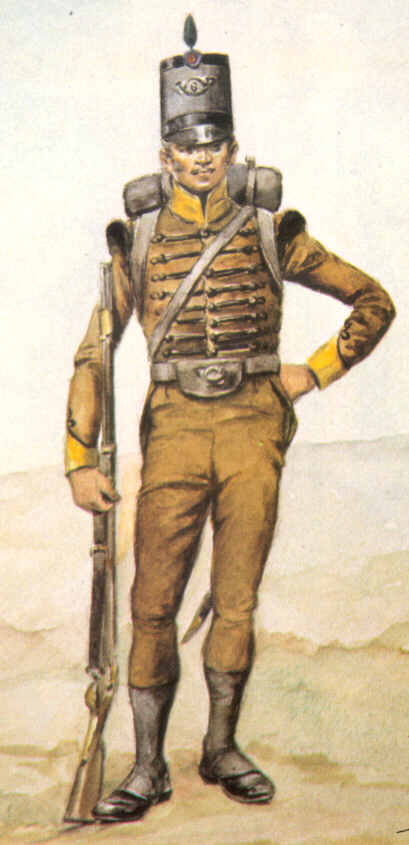
Soldier of the 6th Caçadores Battalion in 1811

At the end of the 18th century, Portugal joined in the Revolutionary Wars, when it sent an expeditionary army to aid Spain against the Revolutionary French in the War of the Pyrenees (Roussillon campaign). However, Spain made a separate peace with France and turned itself against Portugal. In 1801, the Spanish Army invaded Portugal with the aid of France, with the Portuguese Army facing the invaders in the War of Oranges. The refusal from Portugal to antagonize Britain, its old ally, and to adhere to the Continental System, led to the start of the Peninsular War, with the French Army invading Portugal in 1807. The French invasion obliged the strategic transference of the Portuguese Crown to Brazil and put the Portuguese Army in disarray. Under French occupation, the Army was disbanded and its most important units were integrated into the Portuguese Legion raised by order of Napoleon, that would fight for him in the campaigns of Germany, Austria and Russia. Reconstituted and integrated into the Anglo-Portuguese Army, led by the British General Arthur Wellesley, the Portuguese Army performed well in the remainder of the Peninsular War. The first major battle of the Anglo-Portuguese Army was the Battle of Bussaco in 1810, the success of which gave the inexperienced Portuguese troops confidence in their abilities. The infantry and artillery went on to perform well up until the final Battle of Toulouse in 1814 when news arrived of Napoleon's abdication.

The experience from the Roussillon campaign highlighted some gaps in the Portuguese Army, including the lack of light infantry troops. This led to the inclusion of a caçadores (light infantry) company in each of the infantry regiments and the raising of the elite Legion of Light Troops in 1796. This Legion was an experimental all-arms unit, that included an infantry battalion (occasionally referred as caçadores), three cavalry squadrons (occasionally referred as hussars) and a horse artillery battery.

The Portuguese Army underwent a major reorganization in 1807, being focused mainly on the territorial military division of the country, for recruitment, mobilization and training purposes, taking advantage of the data obtained in the 1801 census about the number and distribution of the Portuguese population. The country was divided into three grand military divisions (North, Center and South), these being in turn subdivided into 24 recruiting districts called Ordenança brigades. This geometrical division was established so that each Ordenança brigade would cover an identical population and would be responsible for the raising of a line infantry and two militia regiments. Each grand division then included eight line infantry regiments (grouped in four brigades), four cavalry regiments, one artillery regiment, eight militia regiments and four Ordenanças brigades. The South Division included further the Legion of Light Troops and a second artillery regiment. The existing line infantry, cavalry and artillery regiments were kept, but became numbered instead of being designated after their garrison places or the name of their commanding officers as they were previously. Lisbon's inhabitants also became eligible to be drafted for the Militias, with two regiments being created in the city (the regiments of Royal Volunteers of Foot Militias of Eastern and Western Lisbon). The Army was then to be composed of 24 infantry, 12 cavalry, four artillery and 48 militias regiments, the Legion of Light Troops, the 24 Ordenanças brigades, the Army military corps (Army Staff, Engineers, Fortresses Staff, Fortress fixed garrisons, Guides and Artificiers) and the Army civil corps (Treasury, Hospitals, Hospital Guardianship, Transportation and Army Police). Shortly afterwards, a militia cavalry regiment (the Regiment of Royal Volunteers of Horse Militias) was raised in Lisbon and added to the Army.

The transference of the Portuguese Government and Crown to Brazil meant that some of the most important military officers were also transferred. Most of the remaining more experienced officers and best units of the Army were ordered by the French occupant authorities to form the Portuguese Legion and sent to France to fight for Napoleon. These events suspended the full implementation of the 1807 reorganization and left the Portuguese Army practically dismantled. The military resistance to invaders began to be carried away mainly by the initiative of the Militias and local Ordenanças, which launched a guerrilla war on the rearguard of the French forces, managing to cut their lines of communications and to isolate many of their units. A number of voluntary and irregular units were raised on the initiative of local military, administrative and even ecclesiastical authorities, including the Volunteers Regiment raised by the Governing Board of Portalegre, the Transtagana Legion raised by the corregedor of Beja and the Academic Battalion raised by the University of Coimbra. Another important voluntary unit, the Loyal Lusitanian Legion, was raised in England with Portuguese émigrés.

In 1809, following the Battle of Corunna, the Portuguese Army was reconstituted under the initiative of the Secretary of War Pereira Forjaz and re-trained by the British under the direction of Lieutenant General William Beresford. Most of the 1807 organization was retained, but with the addition of the newly raised independent battalions of caçadores, that would become famous in the Peninsular War. These were formed mainly by the transformation of previous irregular voluntary units and of the Loyal Lusitanian Legion. Six of these battalions were raised in 1808 by order of Secretary Pereira Forjaz, with six additional ones being raised in 1811. The lack of experienced Portuguese officers was mitigated by the inclusion of a number of British officers in the several Army units, in a way that most of them had a Portuguese commanding officer and a British second in command or vice versa. The Militias were augmented with newly raised special units, including the infantry and cavalry regiments of the Royal Commerce Volunteers, the 1st and 2nd battalions of national artillerymen of Lisbon, the 1st and 2nd battalions of national caçadores of Lisbon and the Battalion of the Royal Volunteers of Porto. Active units of Ordenanças were also raised, including the 16 national legions for the defense of Lisbon (each with three battalions) and a number of Ordenanças artillery companies for the garrison of fortresses, these being mainly employed in the Lines of Torres Vedras.

=== South American campaigns ===
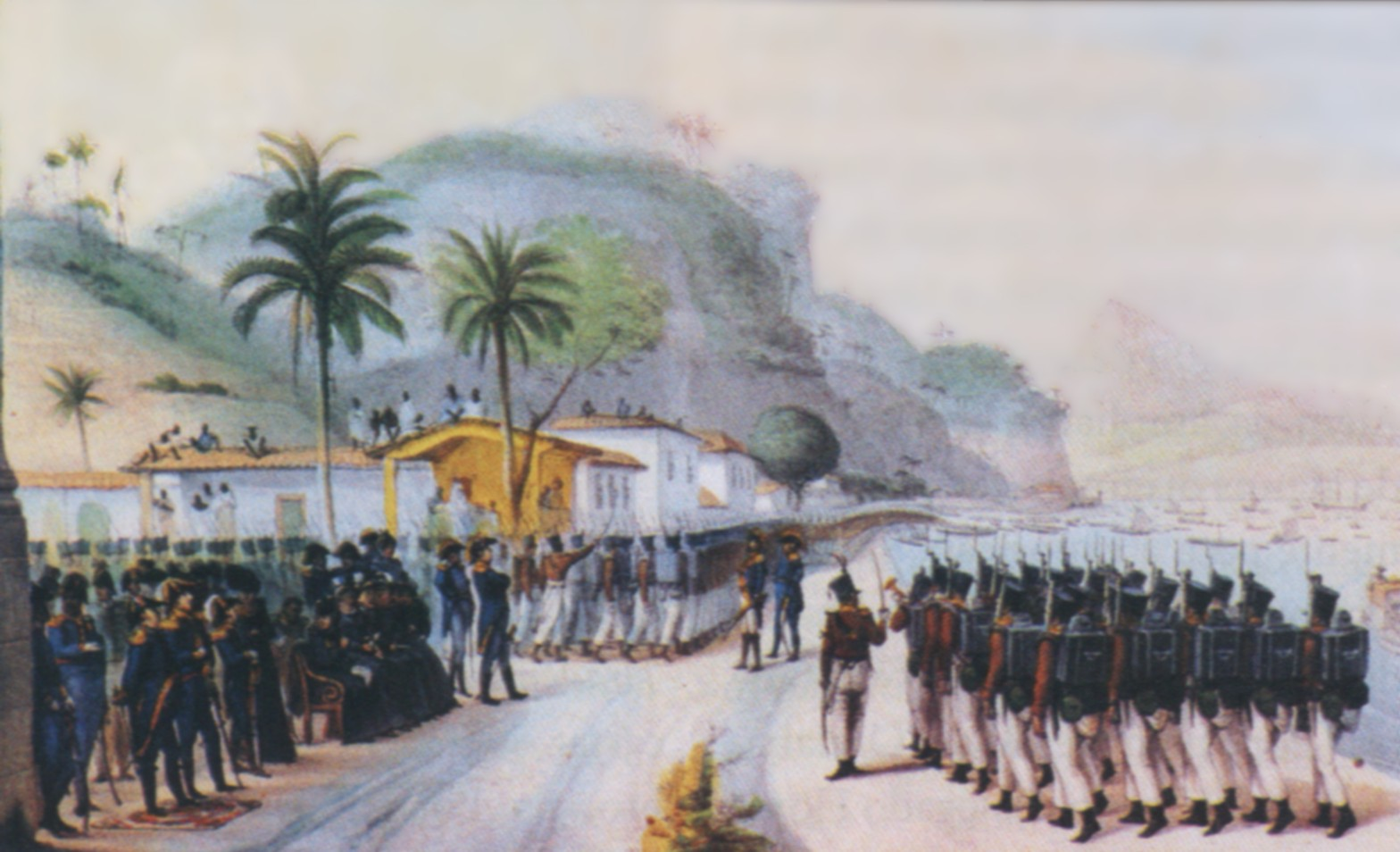
The Division of Royal Volunteers parading in Rio de Janeiro, before embarking to the Banda Oriental campaign

The Portuguese Royal Court and Government installed themselves in Brazil from 1808, with Rio de Janeiro becoming the de facto capital of the Portuguese Empire. In 1815, Brazil was raised to the status of Kingdom, with the whole Portuguese Monarchy becoming the United Kingdom of Portugal, Brazil and the Algarves. As a retaliation against the Napoleonic invasion of the Portugal, the Luso-Brazilian forces in Brazil invaded and conquered French Guiana in 1808. In 1811, the Portuguese Army in Brazil invaded the Banda Oriental (present-day Uruguay), to retake Portuguese claimed territories that were under Spanish occupation. In 1816, the Portuguese forces invaded again the Banda Oriental, defeating José Gervasio Artigas in a series of battles. The Banda Oriental was then annexed to the Portuguese Crown as the Brazilian Cisplatine Province. After the declaration of the Independence of Brazil in September 1822, by Prince heir Pedro of Braganza, the Portuguese Army fought the Brazilian War of Independence. By 1823, the resistance of the Portuguese loyal forces was concentrated in some coastal cities, especially those of Salvador and Montevideo (presently the capital of Uruguay), all under siege of the Brazilian forces. Despite repelling successive attacks by the superior Brazilian forces, but with no perspectives of receiving reinforcements, the Portuguese garrison of Salvador, under the command of General Madeira de Melo, evacuated the city and embarked in a Portuguese naval squadron, sailing to Portugal in July 1823. The Portuguese garrison of Montevideo was the last to resist in Brazil, only surrendering to the Brazilian forces under Carlos Lecor) on 8 March 1824.

With the presence of the Royal Court and of a high number of Portuguese Army officers that accompanied it, the military organization of Brazil was developed, with its ground forces now being frequently referred as the "Army of Brazil" (while the Portuguese Army in Europe was referred as the "Army of Portugal" or the "Army of the Kingdom"). The Army of Brazil would be the origin of the present Brazilian Army. With the end of the Peninsular War, the Army of Brazil was reinforced with military contingents sent from Portugal, one of the most important of these being the Division of Royal Volunteers, commanded by General Carlos Lecor. This Division was originally raised, by the request of the Duke of Wellington, to integrate its army in the Waterloo Campaign, but ended instead to be sent to Brazil.

=== Liberal Wars ===
From 1828 to 1834, occurred the Liberal Wars, a civil conflict that opposed the Miguelites (Absolutists) led by King Michael I to the Liberals led by his brother Peter (ex-Peter I of Brazil and ex-Peter IV of Portugal, defending the rights of his daughter, the Queen Mary II). The Portuguese Army divided itself by the two sides, although most of its units aligned on the side of Michael. The Miguelite forces were occasionally referred as the "Royalist Army". The Liberals raised the so-called "Liberator Army", made up mainly of newly raised units, but also incorporating some units of the regular Army that passed to their side. Both the Miguelite and the Liberal armies were referred as the "Rebel Army" by their respective opponents. The war ended formally on 26 May 1834, with the capitulation of Michael I in the Concession of Evoramonte. Miguelites partisans continued, however, a guerrilla warfare in several regions of the country until around 1838. The Article 9 of the Concession of Evoramonte established that all regiments and corps loyal to Michael should peacefully disband themselves. This meant in practice the dismantling of the "old" Portuguese Army, as most of its centuries-old regiments were disbanded. The victorious Liberals regime then raised a "new" Portuguese Army built essentially from the Liberator Army. The Militias and Ordenanças were also expressly extinguished, thus ending the traditional Portuguese military territorial organization originated in the 16th century. This extinction was mainly related with political reasons, as those organizations were considered traditionalists and far aligned with the Miguelites. To serve as second-line troops, partially replacing the previous organizations, the Liberal regime raised the new National Guard. The National Guard was however not part of the Army, being instead subordinated to the civil administrative authorities. Despite the new regime initially given a high importance, the National Guard turned out to show herself inefficient, undisciplined and highly politicized, being involved in a number of conspiracies and coups, eventually losing the confidence of the authorities and be disbanded in 1847.

As early as 1835, the new organized Army sends an expeditionary division to Spain, to support the Spanish liberals and their Queen Isabel II, in the Carlist War. For several years, the Portuguese Army would also be involved in a number of internal civil conflicts that erupted as remnants of the Liberal Wars. These included the Revolution of Maria da Fonte and the Patuleia.

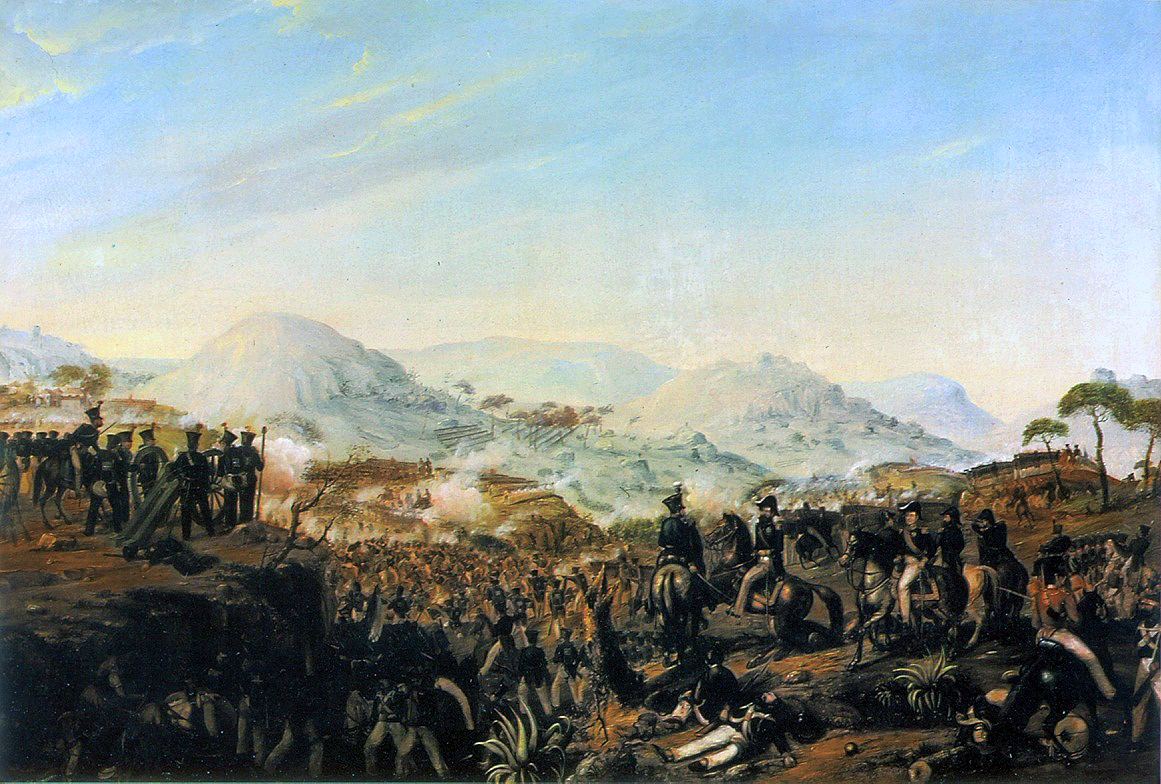
The Battle of Ponte Ferreira, between the Miguelite and the Liberal armies

The Royalist Army (Exército Realista) that fought on the Miguelite side resulted essentially from the reorganization of the Portuguese Army established by King Michael I in 1829. The main changes implemented in this reorganization were the formal disbandment of the military units that joined the liberal side, the change of the line regiments designation system (the units ceased to be identified by numbers and come to be again designated by the names of their garrison places) and the creation of 4 caçadores regiments from the 4 caçadores battalions that remained loyal to Michael. The first line of the Army thus included 8 cavalry, 16 infantry, 4 caçadores and 3 artillery regiments, the Engineers Battalion and the Telegraph Corps. The Militias and Ordenanças were maintained with the previous organization, but were joined by a newly raised volunteers corps (the Corps of Royalist Volunteers), that included around 40 battalions and a number of independent companies of cavalry and caçadores.

The army raised by the Liberals to fight the Miguelites came to be known as the "Liberator Army" (Exército Libertador). It started to be raised from the military units stationed in the Azores (the first portion of the Portuguese territory under Liberal control), including the elite 5th Caçadores Battalion, that had been deployed to garnish the Fortress of São João Baptista in Terceira island. In August 1829, these forces were able to win the Battle of Praia da Vitória, an attempt of the Miguelite Navy to disembark troops and retake Terceira island. The initial Liberal forces in Azores were soon joined by Liberals evaded from the Miguelite army, by exiled Liberal volunteers and by foreign volunteers and mercenaries (mainly French, English, Belgians, Polish, Irish and Scottish). When the Liberal forces landed at Mindelo (near Porto) in July 1832 – initiating the campaign in Mainland Portugal – they included more than 7,000 men, most of them being foreigners. By July 1833, the Liberator Army included the Imperial Staff, the inspections generals of the Cavalry, Engineers and Artillery branches, the governments of arms of the Douro Province and of the fortresses of Porto, the staffs of the six Portuguese brigades, the civil departments of the Army (pay-office, health, military administration, general audit, catering, transports and permanent court-martial), one cavalry regiment, 7 line infantry regiments, 4 caçadores battalions, the Artillery Staff, one artillery battalion, the Academic Artillerymen Volunteers Corps, the Artillerymen Conductors Company, the Corps of the Royal Police Guard of Porto, the Royal Corps of Engineers, the Queens Own Volunteers Regiment, the National Volunteers (one national corps on horse, five national mobile battalions, two national fix battalions, four provisional battalions and one public employees battalion), the Royal Arsenal of the Army, the Ouro Train, the Porto Veterans (two companies), the Military General Depot, the Staff of the Expeditionary Division to Algarve, the Staff of the Azores Division, the staffs of the two foreign brigades, the Queens Own Lancers Regiment (British), the Navy's Regiment (British), the Queen's Own Grenadiers Regiment (Irish), the Scottish Fusiliers Battalion (British), the British Volunteers Battalion (British), and the 1st and 2nd Queen's own light infantry regiments (mainly French and Belgians).

The transformation of the Liberator Army into the new Portuguese Army occurred by the organization established in July 1834. By this organization, the Army included the General Staff, the Staff Corps, the Engineering Corps (including a staff and the Sappers Battalion), the Artillery Corps (including a grand staff and two regiments), 6 cavalry regiments, 12 infantry regiments, 4 caçadores (light infantry) regiments or and the military intendancy. The infantry regiments would form 6 brigades grouped in three divisions, the light infantry regiments would form two brigades grouped in a light division and the cavalry regiments would form three brigades. Each province continued to have a military governor, that commanded the troops stationed there and that were not assigned to a special purpose division. The artillery, cavalry, infantry and light infantry regiments would be numbered. Despite several of these regiments originated from units of the previous Liberator Army, they received numbers identical to those once used by the old disbanded regiments to whom they were not related. Besides the previous referred corps and units, the Army also included the fortresses staffs, the secretariats, the academies, the Military College, the arsenals and trains, the Telegraph Corps, training depots, the Veterinary School, veterans, invalids and fortress garrisons.

=== Constitutional Monarchy ===
After the gradual stabilization of the Constitutional Monarchic regime after the Liberal Wars and with no imminent perceived immediate threats against the Portuguese European territory, the Army will focus on internal security duties and in the organizations of military expeditions to overseas.

The first major re-organization of the Army after its transformation from the previous Liberator Army, occurred as soon as 1837. The cavalry started to be organized in eight regiments, of which four would be of lancers and the others of caçadores a cavalo (mounted rifles). The infantry ceased to have regiments and become organized in 30 independent battalions, of which 10 would be of caçadores (numbered 6 to 25) and the others would be of line infantry (numbered 1 to 5 and 26 to 30). The artillery started to include four regiments, one of which was of horse and mounted artillery and the others were of garrison artillery.

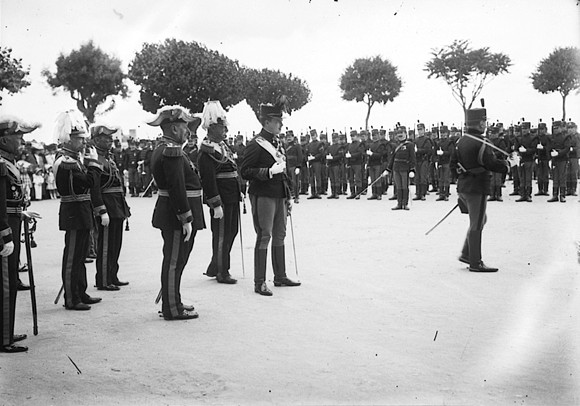
King Manuel II, the last monarch of Portugal, visiting an Army unit, near the end of the monarchy

In 1837, a deep reformation of the military higher education also occurred. The previous Royal Academy of Fortification, Artillery and Design was transformed into the new Escola do Exército (Army School), intended to train the Army officers and also to train civil engineers. The old Royal Academy of the Navy was replaced by the new Escola Politécnica (Polytechnic School), intended to serve as an undergraduate preparatory establishment for the access to the Army School and also to the Naval School.

The infantry came to be again organized in regiments in 1842. It now included the Queen's Grenadiers Regiment, 16 line infantry regiments and 18 caçadores battalions. The Queen's Grenadiers was a special regiment responsible to serve as the royal guard of Queen Mary II. In 1855, it would however cease to have a special status and be transformed into a regular line infantry regiment.

Until the 1840s and to face the internal troubles caused by the political instability that followed the Liberal Wars, the Army continued to be reinforced with units of volunteers, generically referred as the "national battalions". These included units of infantry, caçadores, artillery and cavalry, raised through all the country.

The inexistence of nationwide gendarmerie, meant that the Army would partially be employed in that role, mainly in the rural areas of the country. So, most of the Army units were frequently requested by the local administrative authorities to maintain public order and to perform other police duties, employing in these services an important part of their personnel.

The national defense strategy of the late 19th century focused mainly on the defense of Lisbon, as the major populational, economical and political center of the country and its only part considered defendable against possible aggression from a major power. Lisbon was so transformed in a national redoubt, with a modern system of fortifications built around the city, equipped with advanced systems of armament and communications. This fortified system protected the city against both land and sea attacks and became known as the Lisbon Entrenched Camp.

The last Army organizations in the Monarchy occurred in the late 19th and early 20th centuries. By that time, the Army was administratively organized in three grand military circumscriptions (North, Center and South), each including two military territorial divisions, plus two military commands (Azores and Madeira). Distributed by the several territorial divisions, there were four cavalry brigades and 12 infantry brigades, each including two regiments. Each division, brigade and military command had its own headquarters. The Lisbon Entrenched Camp constituted a separate military command headed by a general, with its own permanent garrison artillery and engineering units. In 1901, the units of Army included one engineering regiment (with sappers-miners, pontoneers, telegraph and railway companies), 3 engineering independent companies (fortress sappers, torpedoes and fortress telegraph), 6 mounted artillery regiments, one horse artillery batteries group, one mountain artillery batteries group, 6 garrison artillery groups, four garrison artillery independent batteries, 10 cavalry regiments, 6 caçadores battalions (these including also troops of cyclists and machineguns) and 27 infantry regiments. Besides these, the Army also included a number of service support units, schools and other establishments. When mobilized to enter in operations, the Army constituted the Field Army. The Field Army included a commander-in-chief and its headquarters, four active army divisions, active army independent troops (including two cavalry brigades), active army train and garrison and reserve troops. Each active division included a headquarters, two infantry brigades (each with three infantry regiments), a caçadores regiment, a cavalry regiment, three field artillery groups, a sappers-miners company and a divisional train. If needed army corps could be organized through the grouping of divisions and composite brigades which included all arms and service supports units.

=== Colonial pacification campaigns ===
From the second half of the 19th century until the beginning of the 20th century, the Portuguese Army focused in a number of colonial pacification campaigns in Africa and in Asia. In the 1840s, the Portuguese forces in Macau face several conflicts, including internal insurrections and Chinese threats, being able to maintain the Portuguese sovereignty in the territory. In India, the Portuguese Army had to face several uprisings of local military units. In Africa, the Portuguese forces organize a number of campaigns intended to suppress tribal uprisings and to expand the hinterland controlled by the Portuguese authorities. These campaigns intensify especially after the beginning of the Scramble for Africa in 1881, to protect the Portuguese territorial claims that were being threatened by other European colonial powers. The success of the Portuguese advance to the interior of Africa led to Portugal reclaiming the sovereignty over the whole African hinterland between Angola and Mozambique. This claim collided however with the British interests on the same territory, leading to the 1890 British Ultimatum, forcing the withdrawal of the Portuguese forces from those areas. The most important pacification campaigns occurred in Mozambique and in Angola in the 1890s. In Mozambique, the Portuguese Army faces the powerful Gungunhana, tribal emperor of Gaza that rebelled against Portugal. Gungunhana is finally defeated and captured at Chaimite in 1895.

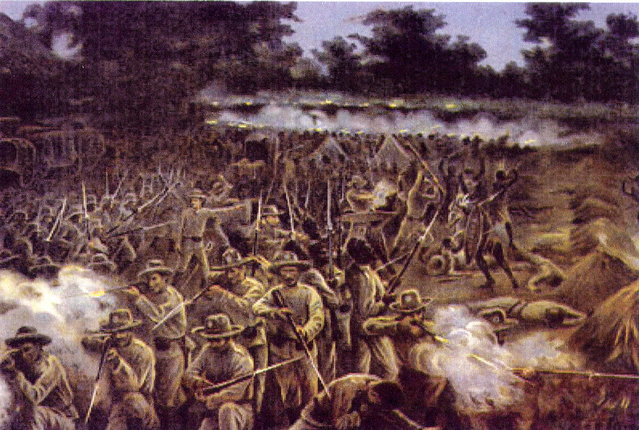
Portuguese troops in the Battle of Marracuene, against the forces of Gungunhana

The military forces of the Portuguese Overseas, continued to constitute separate organizations, distinct from the so-called Army of Portugal or Army of the Kingdom. As so, they were not subordinated to the War Ministry, but instead they were under the supervision of the Overseas Ministry. They usually included local raised units, being reinforced by expeditionary units sent from Portugal. In 1869, the Portuguese troops of the Overseas were globally organized in four administrative divisions: the Army of Western Africa, the Garrison of Mozambique, the Army of India and the Garrison of Macau and Timor. The Army of Western Africa included 5 caçadores battalions, an artillery battery, two second-line battalions and 28 mobile companies, all based in Angola except a caçadores battalion in Cape Verde and another one in São Tomé and Príncipe. The Garrison of Mozambique included 3 caçadores battalions and one veteran company. The Army of India included a corps of engineers, an artillery regiment, a line infantry battalion, 3 caçadores battalions, the Municipal Guard of New Goa and two veteran companies, all based in Goa, except a caçadores battalion in Daman. The Army of India further included its own military academy (the Military and Mathematics School of Goa), which granted university training to its engineers, artillery and infantry officers. Finally, the Garrison of Macau and Timor included an infantry battalion in Macau and two companies in Timor.

Later, the military forces of the Overseas suffer several reorganizations. In 1876, the Overseas Infantry Regiment was created. This regiment had its home garrison in Lisbon, but deployed its forces to the Overseas. Two of its battalions were always deployed in India and Macau, on rotation. This regiment would be disbanded in 1892 and replaced by the Overseas Enlisted Depot.

From the end of the 19th century, the whole of Overseas forces started to be collectively referred as the Exército Ultramarino (Overseas Army) or Exército Colonial (Colonial Army), to distinguish it from the Army in the Metropole (European Portugal) that was now frequently referred as the Exército Metropolitano (Metropolitan Army). A major reorganization of these forces, occurs between 1895 and 1901, taking advantage of the experience obtained in the colonial campaigns that were on course. The organization of the military forces of the Overseas established in 1901 included the headquarters of the overseas provinces and autonomous district, first-line garrisons, military organized corps of police and customs guard, disciplinary corps, military courts, war material depots, fortresses and strongpoints staffs, health service, military administration services, the Overseas Enlisted Depot, retirees and second-line troops. The governors-general of province (Angola, Mozambique and India), the governors of province (Cape Verde, Guinea, São Tomé and Príncipe and Macau) and the governor of autonomous district (Timor) continued to be the superior commanders of the military forces in their respective provinces and district, with the same role as a general commanding a division, superintending the respective headquarters. The governors of subordinate districts were the commanders of the garrisons in their districts, with the role of a general commanding a brigade. The first line units included:

- 3 mixed batteries of mountain and garrison artillery (in Angola, Mozambique and India),
- one European company of garrison artillery (in Macau),
- one Indigenous company of garrison artillery (in Cape Verde),
- 6 mixed companies of mountain artillery and infantry (one in Guinea, 2 in Angola, one in Mozambique and two in Timor),
- 2 mixed companies of garrison artillery and infantry (in São Tomé and Príncipe and Mozambique),
- 3 squadrons of dragoons (one in Angola and 2 in Mozambique),
- 4 independent platoons of dragoons (2 in Guinea, one in India and one in Timor),
- 6 European companies of infantry (one in Cape Verde, one in Angola, 2 in Mozambique, one in India and one in Macau),
- 32 Indigenous companies of infantry (16 in Angola, 10 in Mozambique and 6 in India),
- 6 corps of police (in Cape Verde, São Tomé and Príncipe, Angola, Mozambique, India and Macau),
- 2 disciplinary battalions (in Angola and Mozambique),
- 8 depot companies (4 in Angola and 4 in Mozambique),
- 5 European music bands (3 in Angola and 2 in Mozambique) and
- 4 Indigenous music bands (in Cape Verde, São Tomé and Príncipe, India and Macau).

=== World War I ===
The period before World War I, were years of political instability in Portugal. In the early October 1910, a republican revolutionary event occurred in Lisbon. Despite receiving few popular and military support, the revolutionaries manage to prevail, much thanks to the passive attitude of the Army and its reluctance in suppressing the uprising, with the Constitutional Monarchy being overthrown and the republic being proclaimed on 5 October 1910. One of the first measures of the new republican regime was to implement a military reform that aimed to transform the Portuguese Army into a militia type army, modeled after the Swiss Army.

Portugal participated in World War I on the side of the Allies. The Portuguese Army would engaged in combat against the Germans in the European Western Front, in the South-West Africa and in the East Africa campaigns. The conflict between Portugal and Germany started well before the formal declaration of war between the two countries when several military clashes between Portuguese and German troops occurred in the borders of southern Angola with German West Africa and of northern Mozambique with German East Africa in the middle of 1914. The formal entry in the war would only occur when Germany declared war on Portugal on 9 March 1916 in response to the Portuguese seizure of German shipping.

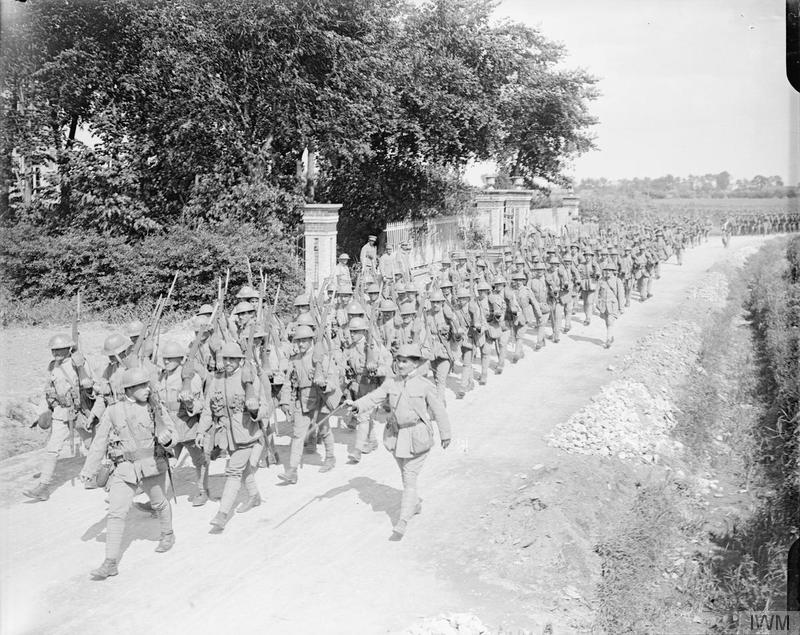
Portuguese troops marching to the line in the Western Front

The republican reform of the Army implemented between January and May 1911 did not change deeply the organization of the last years of the Monarchy, the changes being especially the honors, disciplinary and conscription systems, with the transformation of a mainly professional army into a mainly militia army. Notable changes in the organization included the increase of the number of divisions and regiments, the extinction of the traditional caçadores units, the creation of independent units of machineguns (being part of the infantry, but organized in batteries as the artillery) and the subdivision of the artillery arm in two almost separate branches (the field artillery and the foot artillery, this last being mainly a weapon engineering and technical branch, but being also responsible for the operation of the heavy guns of the garrison and coastal artillery). By this organization, the Metropolitan Army included the general officers, the Staff Service, the several arms and services (the engineering, artillery, cavalry and infantry arms, the military health, military veterinary and military administration services, the military secretariat and the auxiliary staffs), the Army general services (War Secretariat, Army Staff, headquarters and military territorial commands, military courts and justice, military schools, retirees companies and military invalids asylum) and the services of the Lisbon Entrenched Camp. The Army troops included the active troops, the reserve troops and the territorial troops. The active troops included 8 divisions (each with 4 infantry regiments, one machinegun batteries group, one mounted artillery regiment and a cavalry regiment) and a cavalry brigade (with 3 cavalry regiments), plus non-divisionary engineering troops (8 companies of sappers-miners, 8 divisionary sections of bridges, 8 sections of floodlights, 10 sections of field telegraphists, one bridge park, one wireless telegraph company, one balloon company, one railway companies group and one fortress telegraphists company, the majority of these units being administratively grouped in 2 sappers-miners and one pontoneers battalions), artillery troops (2 mountain artillery regiments, one horse batteries group, 2 howitzers batteries groups and 3 independent mountain batteries), infantry troops (3 infantry regiments and 3 independent machinegun companies), health service troops (eight health companies, administratively grouped in three companies groups) and military administration troops (eight supply companies and eight transportation companies, grouped in three military administration companies groups).

Adjustments to the above organization would later be done in the Army. These included the creation of the Military Aeronautical Service in May 1914, following the development of the military aviation that was happening. An aviation unit would integrate the Portuguese Forces campaigning in East Africa and Portuguese pilots would fight in the Western Front integrated in French aviation squadrons. Later, in 1924, the Army aviation would gain the status of a full arm of service (known as the "Military Aeronautics" or "aeronautics arm") as were the engineering, artillery, cavalry and infantry.

For the African campaigns, the local Portuguese colonial forces were reinforced with military expeditions sent from the European Portugal. These expeditions were made of infantry battalions, cavalry squadrons and artillery batteries detached from their parent regiments in European Portugal. Usually, each regiment deployed its 3rd battalion. Around 15 000 men were deployed to Angola and 17 000 to Mozambique. For the European Western Front, around 60 000 men were deployed in two expeditionary forces: the Independent Heavy Artillery Corps (CAPI) and the larger and better known Portuguese Expeditionary Corps (CEP). The CAPI was a heavy artillery regiment, raised with personnel taken from the coastal and garrison artillery units of the Lisbon Entrenched Camp, that operated heavy railway guns under the control of the French Army. The CEP was an infantry formation that would assume the responsibility for a whole autonomous sector of the front, under the control of the British First Army. It was initially raised as a reinforced division, but was then reorganized as an army corps of two divisions, including six infantry brigades, divisionary troops, corps troops, a rearguard base and army troops (heavy artillery and a railway units under the direct control of the First Army). The CEP was deployed to France in the early 1917 and – although almost being destroyed in April 1918, in the Battle of the Lys – it continued to fight on the Western Front until the armistice brought an end to World War I.

=== Inter-wars and World War II period ===
On 28 May 1926, an Army led coup d'état ended the politically instable Portuguese First Republic and established the transitory National Dictatorship, an event that led to the establishment of the New State in 1933. From 1936 on, a number of Portuguese volunteers (known as the Viriatos) offered to fight in the Spanish Civil War on the Francoist nationalist side. Many of these volunteers were officers and NCOs of the Portuguese Army, and most served mainly in elite units like the Spanish Foreign Legion and the National Aviation. Although Portugal did not officially participate in World War II, Portuguese troops fought in Timor against the Japanese invaders and had to deter a planned invasion of the Continental and Atlantic islands territories of Portugal.

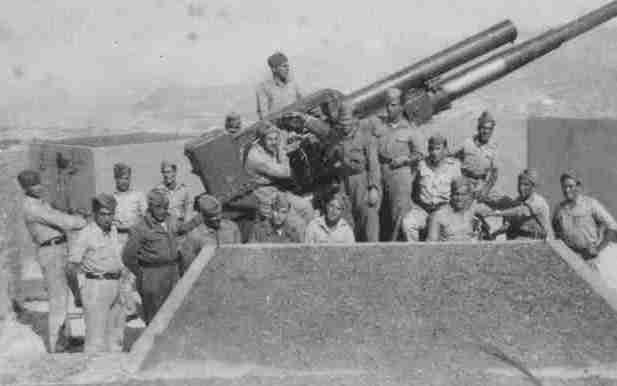
Anti-aircraft gun installed in Mindelo, as part of the Portuguese military reinforcement to defend the Cape Verde isles during World War II

One of the first measures of the new regime was the rationalization and re-organization of the Army, taking into account the lessons learned in the participation in the World War I. The basis of the organization established in July 1926 will prevail, although with diverse and successive adjustments, until the 1990s. The Swiss-inspired concept of a militia army is abandoned and replaced by a mixed model, capable of allowing the rapid engagement of operational forces, which had proven difficult with the previous model. Two types of units came into existence. The first was the territorial units spread across the territory, including the regiments of the several arms, that continued to serve mainly as training and mobilization centers, with a small permanent staff of professional officers and NCOs responsible for the annual training of conscripts. The second type was units permanently maintained in a higher state of readiness, with their effectiveness in time of peace being almost identical to those planned for war. These last units consisted mainly in 10 border defense reinforced battalions (with the title caçadores being recovered to designate these units) and in two brigades of cavalry. No divisions or other field formations, besides the two cavalry brigades, would be permanently maintained active, only being raised if needed. The number of military units was decreased, the territorial divisions were abolished, with the territory of Continental Portugal becoming divided in four military regions and in the Military Government of Lisbon (this one having both the role of military region and the role of the abolished Lisbon Entrenched Camp command).

The Army would suffer another major reorganization in 1937. This reorganization kept the major features of the previous one. Regarding the ground forces, the major changes were the reduction of the number of infantry regiments, from 22 to 16 and the raising of armored units. The militia-type Portuguese Legion is formalized as being part of the military structure. The Military Aeronautics arm – although continued to be administratively part of the Army – gained a high level of operational autonomy, starting to have its own central command, what transformed it into an almost separate branch of service.

During World War II, to deter a possible invasion of the Portuguese islands and overseas territories, the Army had to send several military expeditions to reinforce the local defense forces. As part of the defense measures of the Overseas, the colonial military forces were transitorily placed under the control of the Army, although continuing to be separate from it. The larger contingent of expeditionary forces went to the Azores, with its Army garrison achieving the 35 000 men. The defense of the Azores was crucial as these islands were planned to serve as retreat point and base of the Portuguese Government in case of an enemy occupation of Continental Portugal. Besides this, the Portuguese authorities received intelligence about the existence of both Axis and Allied plans to occupy the islands (including the planned British operations Alloy, Shrapnell, Brisk, Thruster, Springboard and Lifebelt, the US operation War Plan Gray and the German operations Felix, Ilona and Isabella), to use them to control the North Atlantic. The defense of Continental Portugal was also reinforced, especially of the Lisbon area. The measures for the defense of Lisbon included the raising of a complex system of coastal and anti-aircraft defense and the raising of an army corps of three divisions for ground defense.

=== Early Cold War ===
In 1949, Portugal was one of the founding members of NATO. In the peak of the Cold War, the Portuguese Army focused on the preparation for a conventional or even nuclear warfare in Europe, during the 1950s. As part of this preparation, the Portuguese Army increasingly aligned with the doctrine, organization, training and equipment model of the United States Army. In 1950, the Portuguese Armed Forces were created as an integrated organization, with the operational command responsibilities of the Army and the Navy being increasingly transferred to unified bodies of command. The Colonial Military Forces are finally merged with the Metropolitan Army, with a single common Army existing since then, both in the Metropolis (European Portugal) and in the Overseas territories. In 1952, the Military Aeronautics arm is completely separated from the Army – at the same time absorbing the Portuguese Naval Aviation – and becomes the autonomous Portuguese Air Force. However, at the same time, the Army activated a small light aviation service for artillery observation and maintained it until 1955, when it was disbanded and its aircraft transferred to the Air Force.

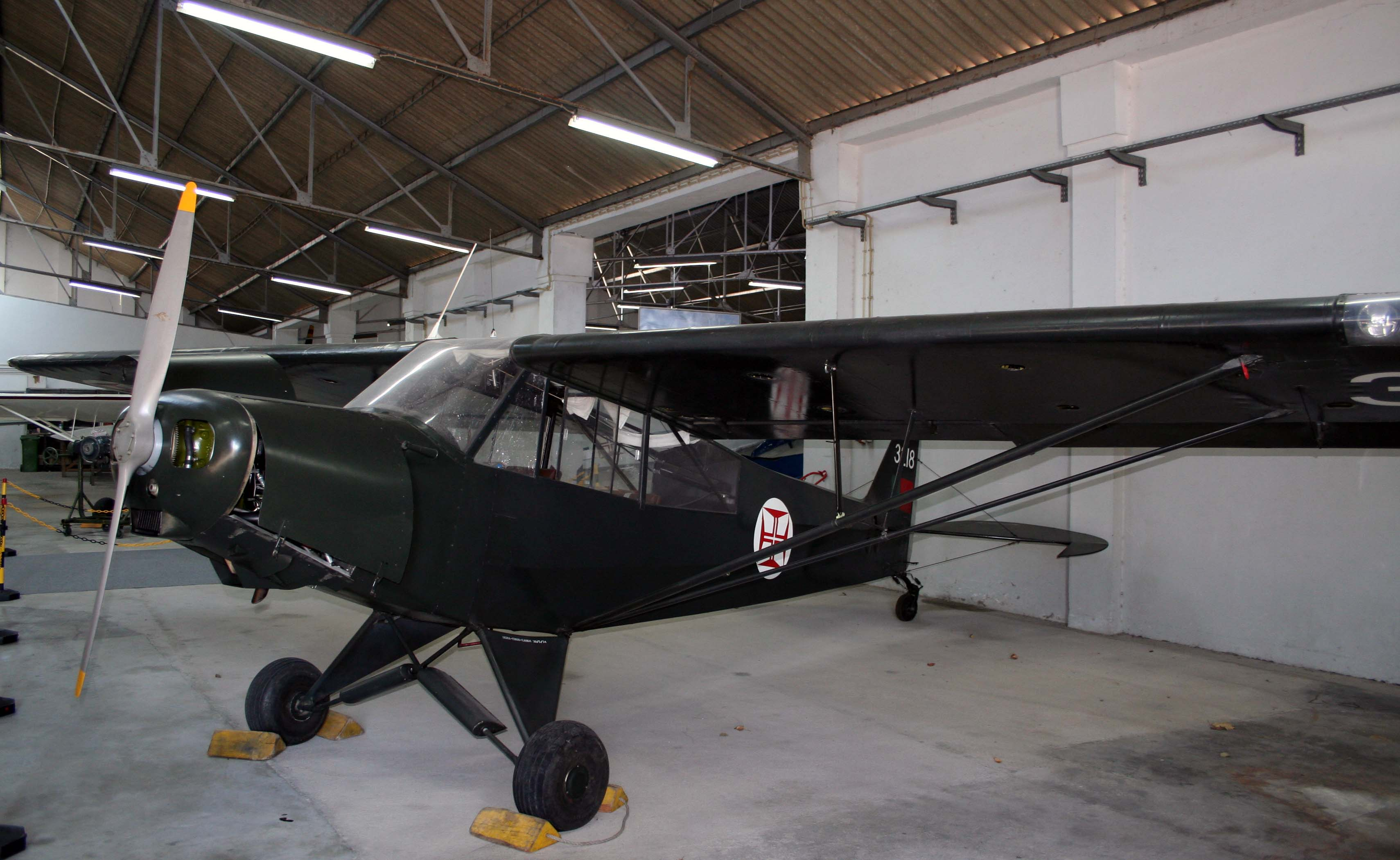
Piper L-21 Super Cub used by the Portuguese Army artillery observation light aviation in the 1950s

With the creation of the roles of Minister of National Defense and Chief of the General Staff of the Armed Forces on 1 August 1950, a unified chain of command for the then existing two branches of services (with the third one being added in 1952) was established. The Chief of the General Staff assumes the operational command functions of the then disbanded roles of major-generals (operational commanders) of the Army and of the Navy. Under the command of the Chief of the General Staff, it is foreseen the existence of commanders-in-chief, with the roles of unified operational commanders of all the ground, naval and air forces in a given theatre. A permanent commander-in-chief is created in each of the Overseas provinces. The Army continues to have however a highly administrative and logistical autonomy, including its own ministry (the Army Ministry, ex-War Ministry) and a network of territorial commands. The new doctrines and military technological requirements of the Cold War led to the creation of new corps in the Army, including the Materiel Service (from the previous weapons and industrial engineers branch of the artillery arm), the Military Police, the Communications arm (from the previous communications branch of the engineering arm) and the Signal Intelligence Service. Two special units are also experimentally raised, these being the commando-type Assault Sappers and, latter, the Paratroopers. However, until the 1960s, the Army high command will show an aversion against the existence of special units, causing the Assault Sappers to be disbanded and the Paratroopers to be fully transferred to the Air Force (where they stayed until 1993).

In the early 1950s, the Portuguese Government committed itself with NATO with an ambitious plan to raise 10 divisions, of which 5 would be stronger field divisions (known as "American type") to constitute an expeditionary army corps to operate under the SHAPE, while the others would be less equipped territorial divisions intended to assure a static defense of the Iberian Peninsula (3 for the defense of the Pyrenees and 2 for the home defense of Portugal). The deployment of these divisions tended to follow the Portuguese defense doctrine of the time, that considered most of Western Continental Europe indefensible in case of a massive invasion by the Warsaw Pact forces, so focusing in transforming the Iberian Peninsula in a redoubt, considered to be defensible at the Pyrenees line. In 1953, the first division of the expeditionary corps (the Division "Nun´Álvares") is raised and was maintained as permanently active. This division adopts almost totally a U.S. organization and equipment, including around 20 000 men, with 3 infantry regiments (each reinforced with a squadron of tanks), a divisionary tank battalion, 3 field artillery battalions and anti-aircraft, engineering, signal and logistical units. To serve as training base for this division, the large Santa Margarida Military Camp is built. As the Nun'Álvares Division started to be mainly maintained by the 3rd Military Region (headquartered in Tomar), from 1955, it starts to be officially designated as 3rd Division. The Nun'Álvares Division would be the strongest and best equipped permanent force of the Portuguese Army, serving as its main training organization. In 1961, the Division engaged in its last major field maneuvers. From then on, the Army would re-orient its main focus to the Overseas war, with the Division being left in a background, although only being officially disbanded in 1976.

=== Overseas wars ===
In December 1961, the small garrisons of the Portuguese Army in the Portuguese India had to face an invasion from overwhelmingly stronger Indian ground, air and naval forces. After brief resistances, each of the isolated Portuguese garrisons of Goa, of Daman, of Diu and of the Angidiva island collapse and surrender. In Africa, the Portuguese Army would be deeply engaged in military counterinsurgency campaigns against separatists forces, that became collectively known as the "Colonial War" or the "Overseas War". These campaigns are fought in three different theatres of operations, separated by thousands of kilometers from each other and from the European Portugal: Angola (1961–1974), Portuguese Guinea (1963–1974) and Mozambique (1964–1974). Despite having almost no external support and facing enemies strongly supported by the Warsaw Pact and even by some Western European countries and despite having to fight in three distant theaters at the same time, the small Portuguese Armed Forces were able to resist in campaign for 13 years. The counterinsurgency campaigns in Africa had various degrees of success, with an almost victory of the Portuguese Armed Forces in Angola, a stalemate in Mozambique and a disadvantageous almost conventional warfare situation in Portuguese Guinea. This war ended after the Carnation Revolution military coup of 25 April 1974 in Lisbon and the subsequently independence of the Portuguese African overseas provinces.

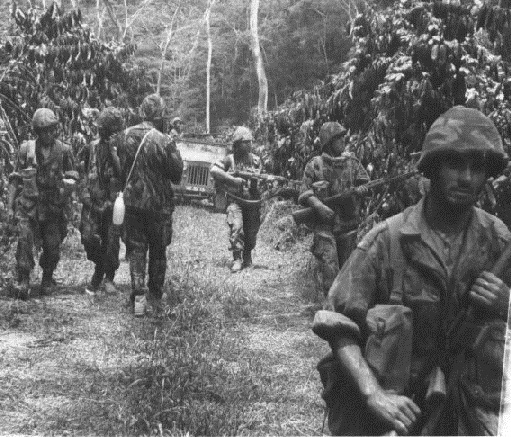
Portuguese Army soldiers progressing in an Angolan jungle trail, attentive to possible ambushes, in the early 1960s

The 1950s, saw a deep reorganization of the military forces in Portugal. The Armed Forces were established as an integrated organization in 1950, encompassing the already existing Army and Navy (to which the newly created Air Force was added in 1952), under the overall command of the Minister of National Defense and the Chief of the General Staff of the Armed Forces. The ground forces in the Overseas were finally merged with the Metropolitan Army, with a single Portuguese Army existing from then on. The establishment of the integrated Armed Forces led to the creation of the permanent roles of commander-in-chief to serve as the unified operational commanders of all the ground, air and naval forces stationed in each of the Overseas provinces. These commanders-in-chief will soon increase their operational importance over the local service commanders, with the Army territorial commands in each province going to have mere logistical responsibilities. In the scope of the peak of the Cold War, the organization of the Portuguese Army in the Overseas was built with a concern on the imminent threat of war in Europe, compared with a perception of the existence of a low risk of conflicts in the Overseas provinces themselves. So, the Overseas forces were re-organized going from a focus on the internal security to a focus on the conventional warfare, at the same time being oriented to be able to reinforce the Army in Europe and not the opposite. As part of these, the previous military organization based in small company-sized units scattered along the territory was replaced by an organization based in battalion and even regiment-sized units concentrated in the main cities. In Angola and Mozambique, this structure was designed to allow the raising of entire field divisions to be deployed to European Portugal in case of a conventional warfare with the Warsaw Pact.

In the early 1960s, however, there was already a perception that guerrilla type conflicts would erupt in some of the Portuguese African territories, leading the Portuguese Army to re-orient its strategy and reorganize its forces in the Overseas, at the same type preparing its forces in Europe to be able reinforce the Overseas. As part of this, the 9th Infantry Regiment in Lamego was transformed in the Special Operations Training Centre, intended to provide counter insurgency and guerrilla warfare training. The Army territorial organization that was implemented when the Overseas war erupted, divided the Portuguese national territory (Metropolitan and Overseas) in military regions (that could be subdivided in territorial commands) and in independent territorial commands. Angola and Mozambique constituted military regions commanded by generals, subdivided in territorial commands, while the other Overseas provinces – including Portuguese Guinea – constituted independent territorial commands (The exception was São Tomé and Príncipe which constituted a territorial command of the Angolan military region, until becoming an independent command in 1962). The Overseas military regions and territorial commands included units of the normal garrison (regiments, battalions and others), which constituted the permanent territorial administrative bodies responsible for the mobilization and preparation of active troops.

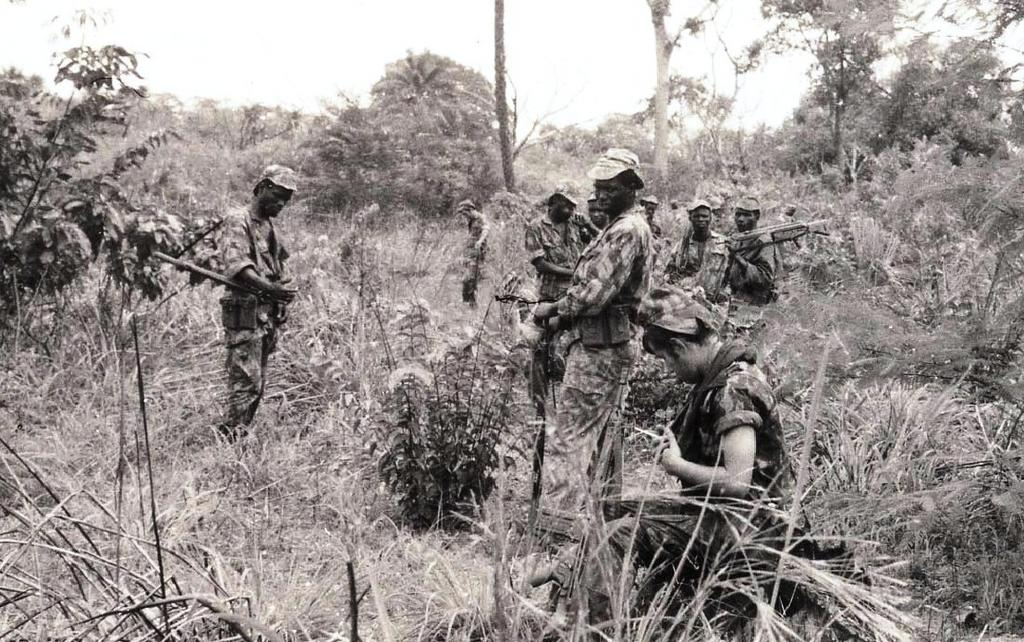
Portuguese Army patrol – integrating African and European soldiers – making a pause in the middle of the Guinean jungle, in 1968

The active troops themselves were organized in formations and units raised by the normal garrison units. Besides the local raised active units, many of these were raised by the European Portuguese regiments and deployed to the Overseas, being referred as "reinforcement units". The active units were temporary units – mainly formed with conscripts framed by a small cadre of career officers and NCOs – that existed only during the tour of duty or active military service period of their elements (usually two years). When their period of existence was near the end, these units were replaced in the field by newly raised similar units, then returning to their parent regiment's barracks, where they were formally disbanded, their conscripts being licensed and their career elements being transferred to other units. The majority of active units employed in the Overseas War were light infantry units, designed for the counterinsurgency role, designated as caçadores (similar units raised by cavalry and artillery regiments had the designation of their respective branches, although trained, equipped and organized as caçadores). These were organized in companies of caçadores that could be independent or be grouped in battalions of caçadores. Besides the caçadores units, the Portuguese Army also raised and fielded regimental-level battlegroups (agrupamentos) headquarters and a number of specialized units (including units of field artillery, anti-aircraft artillery, armored reconnaissance, military police, engineering, signals, mortars, recoilless guns and combat support services). The Army also raised special forces and was involved in the organization of a number of irregular forces. The Army's special forces in the initial stages of the War were the Special Caçadores companies, raised by the 5th (Lisbon) and 10th (Chaves) Caçadores battalions, with specially selected personnel that then received their training in the Special Operations Training Centre. The Army lobby against the special forces prevailed however, with these units ceasing to be raised in 1962, with the intention that all normal caçadores units would receive the same training as the disbanded special caçadores. However, this proved infeasible and the lack of special forces made quickly felt, with some units mitigating this issue by raising informal special forces sub-units with selected personnel, with some of these being referred as "commandos". The Commandos would soon be formalized in Angola and then in the other theatres. From 1966, a special anti-guerrilla horse unit (the Angola Dragoons) also existed.

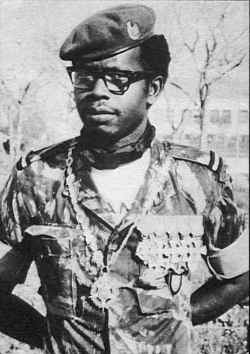
Marcelino da Mata, 1969. Known for his acts of bravery and heroism during the Portuguese Colonial War, having participated in 2412 command operations, he was the most decorated Portuguese military officer in the history of the Portuguese Army.

The majority of the caçadores units were deployed in grid (quadrícula), being scattered through the theatres, with each unit being responsible for the counterinsurgency activities in a given area of responsibility. Usually a caçadores battalion was responsible for a sector, having its companies disperse through the sector, each one being responsible for its own sub-sector. Sometimes, several battalion sectors were grouped in a larger battlegroup area of responsibility. The grid units were often reinforced with artillery, armored reconnaissance and other types of units. Besides the grid units, there were also the intervention forces that were held in reserve by the commands to intervene in any part of the theaters, usually in offensive operations or in the temporary reinforcement of grid units under heavy attack. Most of the intervention forces were units of special forces, but some selected caçadores units also served in this role. By 1974, as active units in the field, the Army had:

- 6 Commando companies, 8 battlegroup HQs, 35 caçadores battalions HQs and 180 caçadores companies in the Angolan theatre,
- one Commando battalion, 4 battlegroup HQs, 18 caçadores battalion HQs and 80 caçadores companies in the Guinean theatre
- and one Commando battalion, 4 battlegroups HQs, 28 caçadores battalions HQs and 120 caçadores companies in the Mozambican theatre,

besides a number of active units of artillery, armor, engineering and other branches, units of normal garrison units and of other bodies.

=== Late Cold War ===
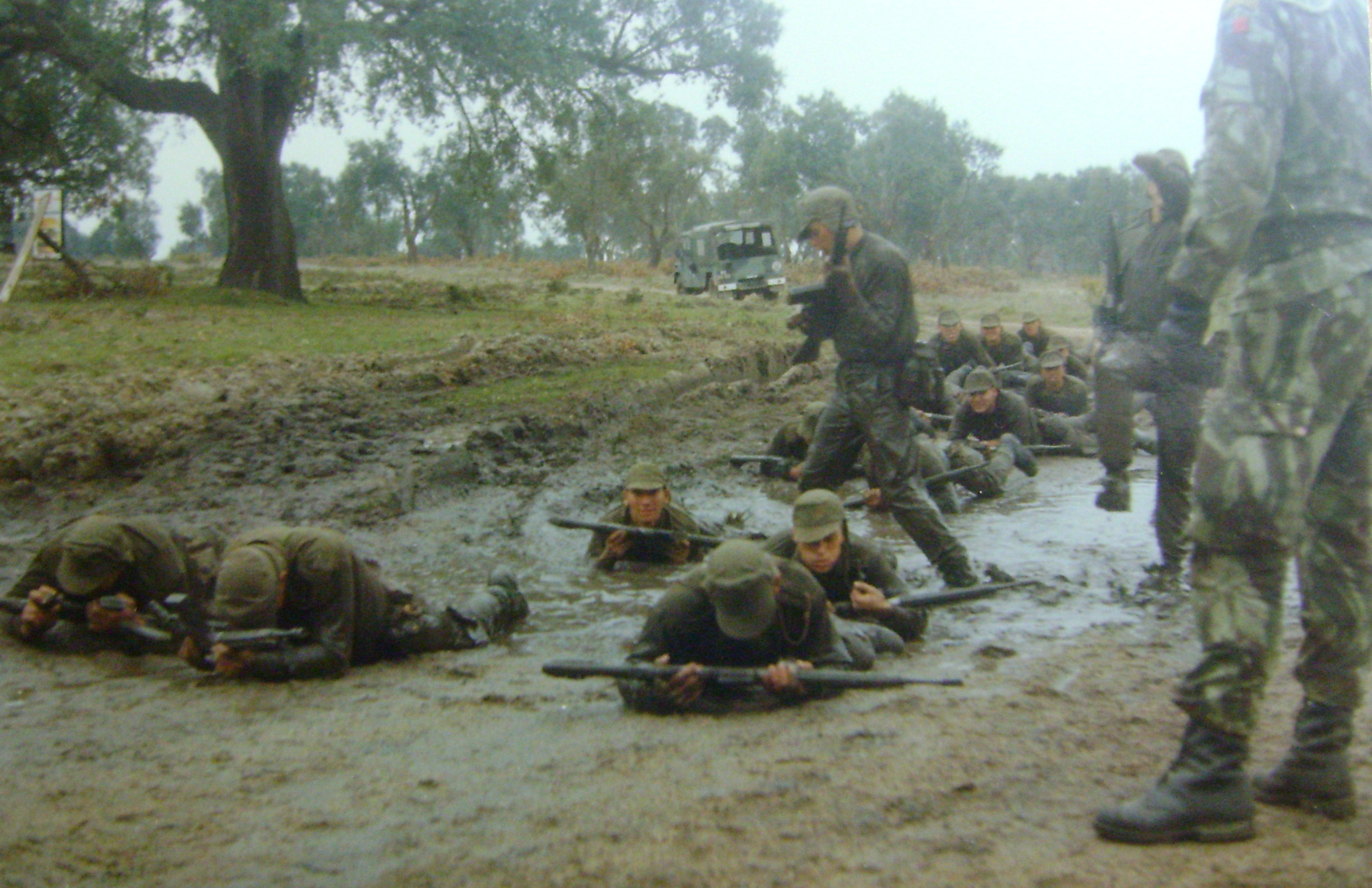
Portuguese Army conscripts engaged in the Commando training course in the mid-1980s

After the independence of most of the Portuguese overseas territories in the 1974–1975 period and after 500 years of being a multi-continental country, Portugal became again mainly confined to its European territory. After the end of the political instability period that followed the Carnation Revolution and the tutelage of the Armed Forces over the new regime, the Portuguese Army returned to the barracks and began the process of changing from an oversized colonial and counter-insurgency army to a conventional European army, including drastic personnel reductions, disbanding of some units, acquisition of new arms and equipment, reorganizing units and roles and fielding new headquarters. In the late 1970s and in the 1980s, the main concern of the Army became again the possible conflict with the Warsaw Pact in Europe, in the scope of the latest period of the Cold War. The Army continued to be mainly staffed with conscripts, framed by a core of professional officers and NCOs.

The Army kept the previous basic administrative and territorial organization. The Army Ministry was formally disbanded in 1974, but its structure continued to exist, with some adjustments, under the management of the Chief of Staff of the Army, who gained the status of minister. The Army and the other branches of the Armed Forces would only be administratively integrated in the new Ministry of National Defense after 1982. The territory of Continental Portugal continued to be divided in military regions, with the Azores and Madeira territorial independent commands now being designated "military zones". The regiments and other territorial units ceased to be numbered and became again designated by the place where they had their garrison. The traditional designation caçadores disappeared, with the battalions of that type being either disbanded or transformed in infantry units. Most of the Army regiments continued to be maintained in cadre strength, usually including three battalions (service, training and operational), with their main role being the annual training of conscripts. Each military region was now responsible to raise a territorial defense brigade and each military zone a territorial defense battle group. These territorial defense formations had a core of units permanently raised, but would only be fully completed through mobilization in case of war. The main operational formation was now the new 1st Independent Composite Brigade, a mixed mechanized and motorized infantry force, based in the Santa Margarida Military Camp, maintained in a high state of readiness with most of its units permanently raised. This formation was intended to be an expeditionary force, replacing the old Nun'Álvares Division as the main contribution of the Portuguese Army for the NATO ground forces. In 1986, the Special Forces Brigade was also raised as a formation kept in a high state of readiness. This was a light infantry formation, having two battalions of Commandos as its core units. The early 1980s see the Special Operations Training Center raising its own special operations unit, which becomes the second type of Army special forces, after the already existing Commandos.

=== Units and formations in the 1980s ===
Traditionally the Portuguese Army maintained (until 2009) two distinct structures. A Base Structure of the Army (Estrutura Base do Exército (EBE)) included the depot units (regiments, centers and schools), which had responsibilities to train, arm and support troops, maintain military infrastructure and support the civilian population during emergencies.

A Permanent Operational Force of the Army (Força Operacional Permanente do Exército) included the operational units of the Army.

By the late 1980s, there were two brigades directly responsible to the Army Staff, the 1st Independent Mixed Brigade (established 11 May 1978) and the Special Forces Brigade (formed 3 July 1984, based upon the mechanised Commando Regiment), four military regions, and two overseas military zones.

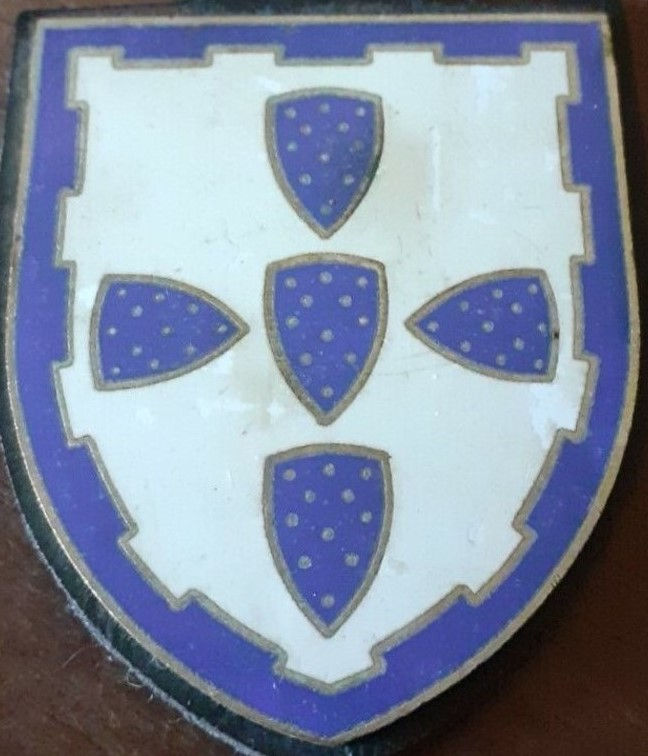
- Badge of the 1st Independent Mixed Brigade
  1st Independent Mixed Brigade
  - Headquarters
  - Armoured Battalion
  - Mechanized Infantry Battalion
  - Motorized Infantry Battalion
  - Motorized Infantry Battalion
  - Cavalry Reconnaissance Squadron
  - Armoured Combat Engineer Company
  - Self-Propelled Anti-Aircraft Company
  - Self-Propelled Surface-to-Air-Missile Company
  - Light Surfact-to-Air Missile Company
  - Mixed Field Artillery Battalion
- Special Forces Brigade (Brigada de Forças Especiais) (Lamego)
  - Commando Regiment (Regimento de Comandos) (Amadora)
    - Headquarters
    - 1º Commando Battalion
    - 2º Commando Battalion
    - 3º Commando Battalion (training unit)

=== Military Regions ===
Military Regions (Regiões Militares)

==== Military Region North ====
The Military Region North covered the Districts of Bragança, Vila Real, Porto, Braga and Viana do Castelo.

- Headquarters – Porto
  - Porto Infantry Regiment
  - Chaves Infantry Regiment
  - Vila Real Infantry Regiment
  - Braga Cavalry Regiment
  - Lancer Cavalry Squadron
  - Administration Battalion
  - Espinho Engineer Regiment

==== Military Region Center ====
The Military Region Center covered the Districts of Santarém, Leiria, Coimbra, Castelo Branco, Aveiro, Viseu and Guarda.

- Headquarters – Coimbra
  - Abrantes Infantry Regiment
  - Castelo Branco Infantry Regiment
  - Tomar Infantry Regiment
  - Aveiro Infantry Regiment
  - Leiria Artillery Battalion
  - Lancer Cavalry Squadron

==== Military Region South ====
The Military Region South covered the Districts of Faro, Beja District, Évora and Portalegre.

- Headquarters – Évora
  - Beja Infantry Regiment
  - Elvas Infantry Regiment
  - Faro Infantry Regiment
  - Estremoz Cavalry Regiment
  - Sul Lancer Squadron

==== Military Region Lisbon ====
The Military Region South covered the Districts of Lisbon and Setúbal.

- Headquarters – Lisbon
  - Mafra Infantry Regiment
  - Lisbon Artillery Regiment
  - Queluz Infantry Regiment
  - Coastal Artillery Regiment
  - Lisbon Engineer Regiment
  - Lisbon Lancer Regiment (military police)

=== Military Zones ===
There are two Military Zones (Zonas Militares):

==== Madeira Military Zone ====
- Headquarters – Funchal, Madeira
  - Headquarters Team
  - Funchal Garrison Regiment
  - Funchal Lancer Squadron

==== Azores Military Zone ====
- Headquarters – Ponta Delgada, Azores
  - Headquarters Team
  - Angra do Heroísmo Garrison Regiment
  - Ponta Delgada Garrison Regiment
  - Ponta Delgada Lancer Squadron

=== Post Cold War ===
The end of the Cold War and the consequent reduction of the threat of a conventional warfare in Europe brought the refocus of the Portuguese Army. From the beginning of the 1990s, the Army started a process of deep transformation, evolving from a mainly conscript army organized as skeleton structure oriented to support the raising of operational units through mobilization to a much smaller professional army organized with permanent operational units. This change implied a rationalization of the forces that included the deep reduction of personnel, the disbandment of a number of regiments and bodies (including the Commando Regiment) and the transference of the Parachute Troops from the Air Force to the Army.

The involvement of Portugal in a series of multinational and even national peace operations in foreign countries led the Army to become again a mainly expeditionary oriented force. Since the end of the 20th century, the Portuguese Army participated with national deployed forces in numerous foreign operations, including in Angola, Mozambique, Bosnia and Herzegovina, Kosovo, East Timor, Iraq, Afghanistan and Lebanon.

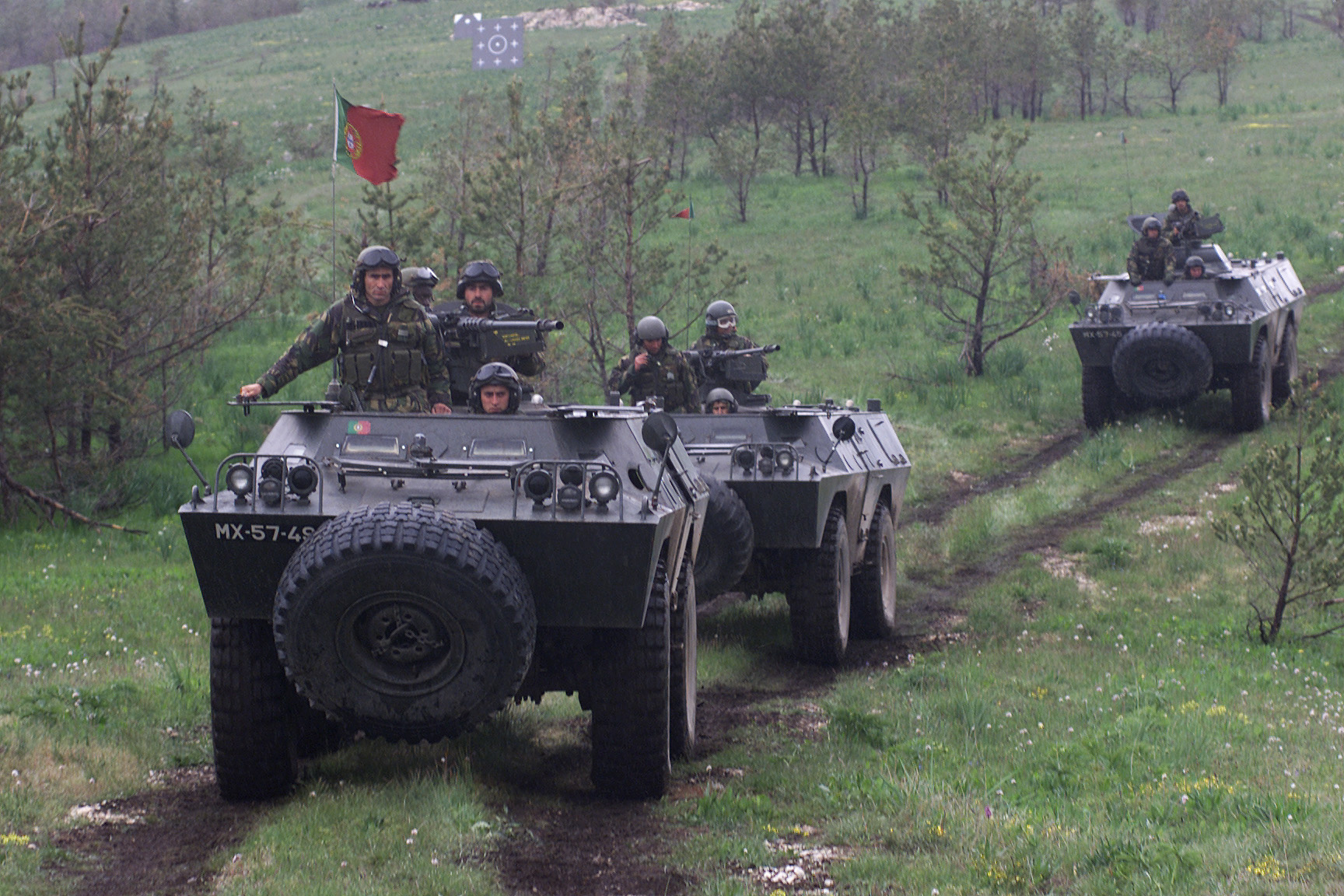
Portuguese Army Chaimite V200 armoured vehicles in western Bosnia, 2002

As part of the Army transformation, it was re-organized in 1993. The division of the territory in military regions and zones was kept, with the reduction of the number of regions, but with the raising of the Airborne Troops Command (using the structure of the previous Air Force's Paratroopers Command) and the Santa Margarida Military Camp as two special territorial commands. The regiments of the Army became again designed by numbers and not anymore by the place where they were based. The assigned numbers were not consecutive, as in previous organizations, but were the historical numbers previously used by each unit or by its predecessor in the same garrison place. The old 1950s plans to equip the Army with light aviation assets were resumed, with the raising of a Light Aviation Unit that was intended to operate helicopters. However, the reception of the planned helicopters was delayed successively until being finally canceled and the unit disbanded. The military regions and zones continued to be responsible for keeping territorial defense brigades and battle groups, mostly maintained only in cadre strength in time of peace. The Army now would have an increased permanent operational force with three brigades: the Independent Airborne Brigade (BAI), the Independent Mechanized Brigade (BMI) and the Light Intervention Brigade (BLI). The BAI resulted from the old Air Force's Light Paratrooper Brigade, also absorbing the parachute qualified members of the disbanded Commando Regiment. The BMI resulted from the fully mechanization of the previous 1st Composite Brigade. The BLI would be a completely newly raised motorized infantry brigade, although inheriting part of the disbanded Special Forces Brigade. Operationally, each of the three brigades had a similar organization that included three maneuver (infantry / armoured) and one field artillery battalion, engineering, signals and services companies, an armored reconnaissance squadron and an anti-aircraft battery. Administratively however each of the brigades had completely different organizations, with the BAI being entirely maintained by the Airborne Troops Command in several of its regiments and other units spread across the country, with the BMI being entirely maintained by the Santa Margarida Military Camp concentrated in a single place and with the BLI being maintained by the several military regions in their several regiments spread across the country. In the new organization implemented in 2006, the military regions, the Airborne Troops Command and the Santa Margarida Military Camp command would be finally disbanded. This implied the completely disbandment of the territorial defense brigades. The Azores and Madeira military zones were however maintained, being responsible for the command of the garrison and territorial defense forces stationed in their respective isles. The three operational brigades – respectively renamed Rapid Reaction Brigade (BriRR), Mechanized Brigade (BriMec) and Intervention Brigade (BrigInt) – assumed also the administrative role of their former parent commands, starting to control the regiments responsible for maintaining their operational units (the exception being the BriMec, whose operational units were not maintained by regiments, being administratively directly under the brigade headquarters). As part of this new organization, the re-raised Commando units and the Special Operation Troops were integrated in the BriRR, joining the parachute troops. The BrigInt evolved to a light mechanized brigade, with its units being equipped with wheeled armored vehicles. In the 2010s, the Armed Forces of Portugal created the Immediate Reaction Force (FRI, Força de Reação Imediata), with the main mission of conducting operations of evacuation of Portuguese citizens from foreign geographies under crisis or tension, to participate in humanitarian operations in defense of the national interests and to assure the responsibilities of the Armed Forces in case of severe catastrophes in the National Territory. The FRI includes the ground, the special operations, the naval and the air components, with the Army assuring the first component and participating in the second one. The initial core of the ground component – with an operational readiness of 48 hours – includes a battalion headquarters, a maneuver company, an EOD team, a signal detachment, a CIMIC tactical team and a sanitary module. Most of this core is assured by one of the paratrooper battalions of the Rapid Reaction Brigade, which also maintains a second maneuver company ready to serve as reinforcement. The Army also provides a special operations detachment to the initial core of the special operations component. In April 2012, the FRI was activated for the first time in a real situation, when a military coup occurred in Guinea-Bissau allowed the FRI to be deployed and pre-positioned in Cape Verde, ready to intervene in the previous mentioned country if needed.

== General organization ==
The general organization presently in force for the Portuguese Army was established in December 2014. Accordingly, with this organization, the Army is commanded by the Chief of Staff of the Army and includes:

- the Army Staff (EME);
- the central bodies of administration and management;
- the Land Forces Command (CFT);
- the bodies of advisement;
- the Inspection General of the Army (IGE);
- the base bodies;
- the elements of the operational component of the system of forces.

=== Chief of Staff of the Army ===
The Chief of Staff of the Army (Chefe do Estado-Maior do Exército, CEME) is the Army commander. He/she is the only officer with the rank of general (four stars) in the Army. The CEME is the principal adviser of the minister of National Defense and of the Chief of the General Staff of the Armed Forces in all Army specific matters, having the competence foreseen in the Law and participates, inherently, in the bodies of advisement in it foreseen.

The Office of the Chief of Staff of the Army – headed by a major-general – is the personal and direct support body of the CEME.

The CEME is assisted by the Vice-Chief of Staff of the Army (VCEME), who is the Army second-in-command. The VCEME is a lieutenant-general superordinate to all the other Army officers of the same rank. Under the direct dependency of the VCEME are the Directorate of Communications and Information Systems, the Directorate of History and Military Culture and the Directorate of Education.

=== Army staff ===
The Army Staff (Estado-Maior do Exército, EME) is the body of study, conceiving and planning of the Army activities, for the decision support of the CEME. It is headed by the VCEME, assisted by a major-general designated EME Director-Coordinator. It includes the Coordinator Staff and the Support Unit.

=== Central bodies of administration and management ===
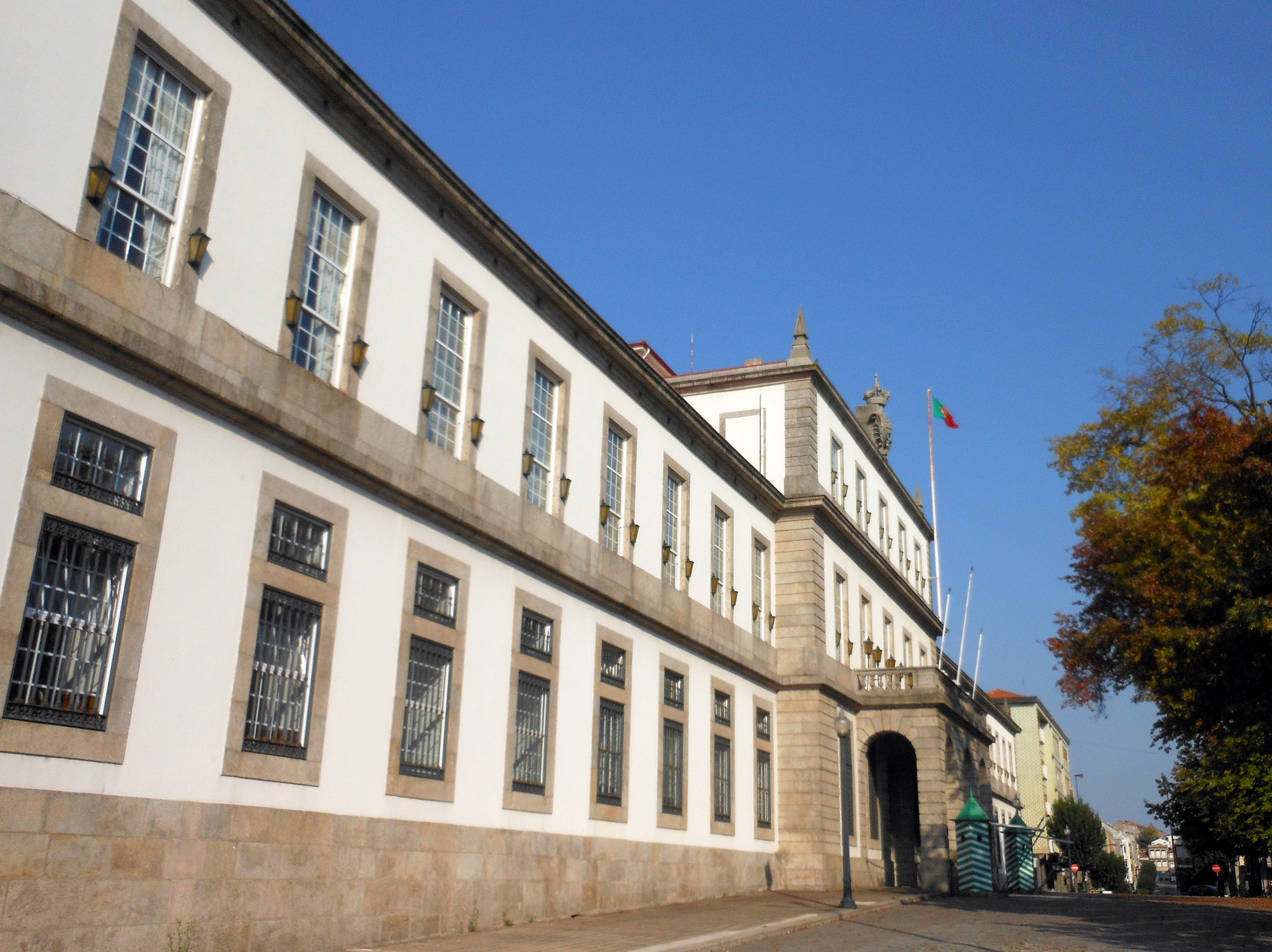
The Portuguese Army's Personnel Command, installed at the Santo Ovídio barracks, Porto

The central bodies of administration and management have a functional character and are intended to assure the management and the execution of essential specific activities, namely in the management of human, material, financial, intelligence and infrastructure resources. They are headed by general officers, directly subordinated to the CEME. These bodies are:

- Personnel Command (CMDPESS) – assures the Army's activities in the scope of the human resources administration, of the training and of the health. It is commanded by a lieutenant-general designated Adjutant-General of the Army. Besides the office of the commander and the support unit, the CMDPESS includes the Directorate of Training, the Directorate of Human Resources Administration, the Directorate of Personnel Services and the Directorate of Health;
- Logistics Command (CMDLOG) – assures the Army's activities in the scope of the material resources administration, of the movements and transportation and of the infrastructures. It is commanded by a lieutenant-general designated Quarter-Master General of the Army. Besides the office of the commander and the support unit, the CMDLOG includes the Directorate of Material and Transportation, the Directorate of Procurement and the Directorate of Infrastructures;
- Directorate of Finance (DFIN) – assures the administration of the financial resources made at the disposal of the Army. It is headed by a major-general, designated Director of Finance.

=== Land Forces Command ===
The Land Forces Command (Comando das Forças Terrestres, CFT) is the land component command. It is commanded by a lieutenant-general, directly subordinated to the CEME, with a major-general as second-in-command.

The CFT has the mission of supporting the exercise of command from the part of the CEME, in view of the preparation, the readying and the sustentation of the forces and means of the operational component of the system of forces, of the accomplishment of the missions regulated by particular legislation and other missions given to the Army, keeping the Chief of the General Staff of the Armed Forces permanently informed of the employed forces and means and of the development and results of their respective operations and of the administration and management of the units and bodies of the fixed component placed under its direct dependence.

Under the dependence of the CFT are the CFT Headquarters (QGCFT), the military zones commands and their respective headquarters, the formations commands and their respective headquarters and the elements of the operational component of the system of forces.

=== Advisory bodies ===
The advisory bodies support the decisions of the CEME in special and important matters regarding the preparation, discipline and administration of the Army. These bodies are:

- Higher Council of the Army (CSE) – it is the highest advisory body of the CEME. Under the presidency of the CEME, it includes all the lieutenant-generals of the Army;
- Higher Council of Discipline of the Army (CSDE) – it is the advisory body of the CEME in disciplinary matters;
- Medical Board of Appeal of the Army (JMRE) – it has the mission of analyzing appeals regarding decisions taken by the competent entities and advising based in the opinions issued by other medical boards of the Army.

=== Inspection-General of the Army ===
The Inspection-General of the Army (Inspeção-Geral do Exército, IGE) is the inspection body of the Army. Its mission is to support the CEME in the exercise of the role of control and evaluation, through the activities of inspection and certification of forces. It is headed by the Inspector-General of the Army, who is a general officer in the reserve.

=== Base bodies ===
The base bodies are responsible for the training, the sustainment and the general support of the Army. They include units, establishments and bodies divided by the areas of obtainment and administration of human resources, of readying of forces, of logistical support, of teaching and training and of divulgation and preservation of the military culture.

Among the many different types of base bodies are the Military Academy, the School of the Arms and the regiments. The Military Academy is a public military university establishment with the primary mission of training the professional officers of the arms and services of the Army and of the National Republican Guard. The School of the Arms is a training unit with the primary mission of conceiving and provide training programs in the scope of the combat and combat support arms. The regiments are the base units of the Army and integrate the structure for the readying of forces and logistical support. Despite being designated "regiments" and being usually associated to an arm of service for historical reasons, presently these types of organizations are not deployable units, serving mainly as military bases intended to lodge and support the operational deployable units (battalions/groups, independent companies/squadrons/batteries and others) permanently stationed or temporary deployed in their barracks. Some regimental type units do not include the word "regiment" in their designation as are the cases of the Special Operations Troops Center, of the Santa Margarida Military Camp and of the Army Materiel General Support Unit.

=== Elements of the operational component of the system of forces ===
The elements of the operational component of the system of forces are the Army's forces and means for the fulfillment of the missions of operational nature. These elements are:

1. The Land Forces Command;
2. The commands of the formations and operational units – the formations are force echelons that include operational units, having a balanced organization of elements of command, maneuver and support that allow them to effectuate operational training and to conduct independent operations. The formation commands are commanded by brigadier-generals.
3. The commands of military zone – they include all the Army's units, bodies and other establishments located in each of the autonomous regions of Portugal. They assure the preparation and the training of the forces under its command, being given to them missions and operational means. Each one is commanded by a brigadier-general.
4. The general support and emergency military support forces – they are combat support and service support units that provide additional capabilities to the formations, military zones and operational units and the flexibility to respond to specific international commitments. They assure widely set of capacities that can be employed in supplementary support to civil authorities in missions of support to the development and welfare of the population, namely in the scope of a national articulated response to catastrophe and calamity situations.

== System of forces of the Army ==
As a whole, the Army is part of the system of forces of the Portuguese Armed Forces. The system of forces of the Army itself includes a fix component and an operational component.

=== Fix component ===
The fix component of the system of forces of the Army is constituted by the base bodies, which guarantee the training, the sustainment and the general support of the Army. These are all non-deployable elements and include regiments, schools, centers and number of other types of bodies. An important part of these bodies is responsible to prepare and maintain the deployable operational units and other elements of the operational component of the system of forces.

Divided by area, the following list of base bodies was defined in July 2015:

Location of the main Army base units in Continental Portugal. Off-map to west are RG1 and RG2 (Azores) and RG3 (Madeira). Colors represent:
– Units of the Mechanized Brigade (BriMec)
– Units of the Rapid Reaction Brigade (BriRR)
– Units of the Intervention Brigade (BrigInt)
– General support units
1. Obtainment and administration of human resources:
  - CPAE – Army Applied Psychology Center, Lisbon
  - CRL – Lisbon Recruiting Center, Lisbon
  - CRVNG – Vila Nova de Gaia Recruiting Center, Vila Nova de Gaia
  - GCSA – Amadora Office of Classification and Selection, Amadora
  - GCSVNG – Vila Nova de Gaia Office of Classification and Selection, Vila Nova de Gaia
  - CRLisboa – Recruitment Center, Lisbon
  - CRVila Nova de Gaia – Recruitment Center, Vila Nova de Gaia
  - Public Service Offices in Aveiro (GAPAveiro), Braga (GAPBraga), Bragança (GAPBragança), Castelo Branco (GAPCastelo Branco), Chaves (GAPKeys), Coimbra (GAPCoimbra), Évora (GAPÉvora), Funchal (GAPFunchal), Guarda (GAPGuarda), Lamego (GAPLamego), Lisbon (GAPLisboa), Ponta Delgada (GAPPonta Delgada), Santarém (GAPSantarém), Tavira (GAPTavira), Tomar (GAPTomar), Vila Real (GAPVila Real) and Viseu (GAPViseu).
2. Readying of forces:
  - RI1 – 1st Infantry Regiment, Beja and Tavira (detachment)
  - RI10 – 10th Infantry Regiment, Aveiro
  - RI13 – 13th Infantry Regiment, Vila Real
  - RI14 – 14th Infantry Regiment, Viseu
  - RI15 – 15th Infantry Regiment, Tomar
  - RI19 – 19th Infantry Regiment, Chaves
  - RAAA1 – 1st Anti-Aircraft Artillery Regiment, Queluz
  - RA4 – 4th Artillery Regiment, Leiria
  - RA5 – 5th Artillery Regiment, Vendas Novas
  - RL2 – 2nd Lancers Regiment, Lisbon
  - RC3 – 3rd Cavalry Regiment, Estremoz
  - RC6 – 6th Cavalry Regiment, Braga
  - RE1 – 1st Engineers Regiment, Tancos
  - RE3 – 3rd Engineers Regiment, Espinho
  - RT – Communications Regiment, Porto
  - RCmds – Commando Regiment, Belas
  - RPara – Parachute Regiment, Tancos
  - RG1 – 1st Garrison Regiment, Angra do Heroismo
  - RG2 – 2nd Garrison Regiment, Ponta Delgada
  - RG3 – 3rd Garrison Regiment, Funchal
  - RAME – Emergency Military Support Regiment, Abrantes
  - CTOE – Special Operations Troops Centre, Lamego
  - CMSM – Santa Maria Military Camp, Santa Margarida da Coutada
  - CSMIE – Army Intelligence and Military Security Center, Lisbon
3. Logistical support
  - CIGeoE – Army Geospatial Intelligence Center, Lisbon
  - RMan – Maintenance Regiment, Entroncamento
  - RTransp – Transportation Regiment, Lisbon
  - UAGME – Army Materiel General Support Unit, Alcochete
  - DA – Procurement Management, Lisbon
  - DIE – Infrastructure Department, Lisbon
4. Teaching and training
  - AM – Military Academy, Lisbon
  - CM – Military College, Lisbon
  - IPE – Army Pupils Institute, Lisbon
  - EA – School of the Arms, Mafra
  - ES – School of the Services, Póvoa de Varzim
  - ESE – Army Sergeants School, Caldas da Rainha
5. Medical support
  - CSMTSM – Military Health Centers of Tancos / Santa Margarida
  - CSMC – Coimbra Military Health Center
  - UMMV – Military Unit of Veterinary Medicine
  - UMLDBQ – Military Laboratory Unit for Biological and Chemical Defense
  - UNS II Évora – Military Health Unit, Évora
  - UNS II Amadora – Military Health Unit, Amadora
  - UNS II Funchal – Military Health Unit, Funchal
  - UNS II Açores – Military Health Unit, Azores
6. Dissemination and preservation of military culture
  - JE – Army Journal, Lisbon
  - BIBLEX – Army Library, Lisbon
  - ARQGEX – Army General Archives, Lisbon
  - AHM – Military Historical Archives, Lisbon
  - MML – Lisbon Military Museum, Lisbon
  - MMP – Porto Military Museum, Porto
  - MMB – Bragança Military Museum, Bragança
  - MME – Elvas Military Museum, Elvas
  - MMB – Buçaco Military Museum, Buçaco
  - MMA – Azores Military Museum, Angra do Heroismo
  - MMM – Madeira Military Museum, Funchal
  - BE – Army Band, Amadora
  - FANFEX – Army Fanfare Band, Amadora
7. Other units
  - EPM – Military Prison Establishment, Tomar
  - CPAE – Army Applied Psychology Center
8. Recently disbanded bodies:
  - CME – Military Center of Electronics, Paço de Arcos
  - IO – Instituto de Odivelas, Odivelas
  - UALE – Army Light Aviation Unit, Tancos
  - ESSM – Military Health Service School, Lisbon

=== Operational component ===
The operational component of the system of forces include the Army's elements dedicated to the fulfillment of the missions of operational nature. These elements include the operational command bodies, the formations commands and the deployable operational units. These elements are prepared, trained, supported and administratively maintained by the regiments and other bodies of the fix component of the system of forces.

The elements of the operational component are:

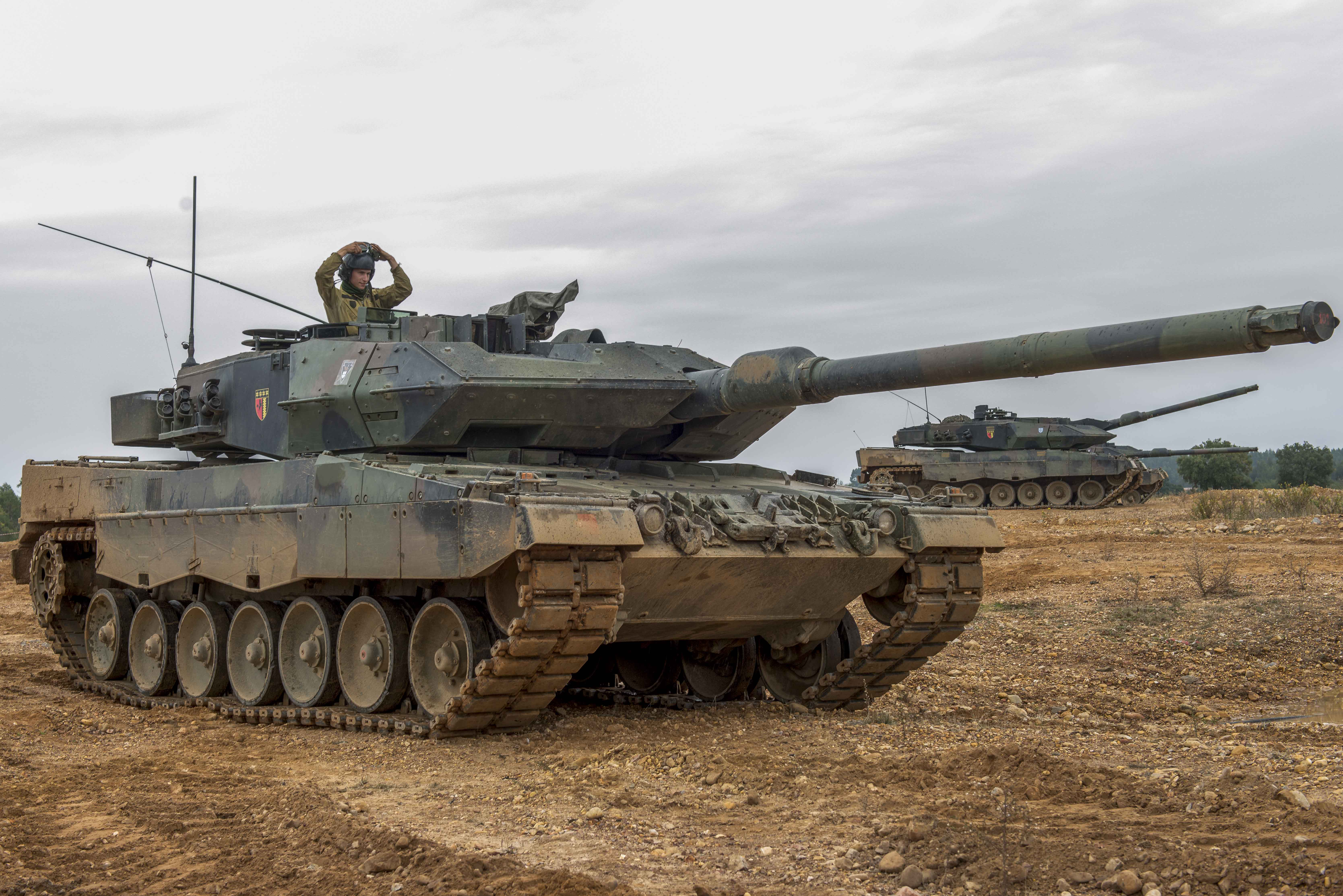
Leopard 2A6 tanks of the Mechanized Brigade

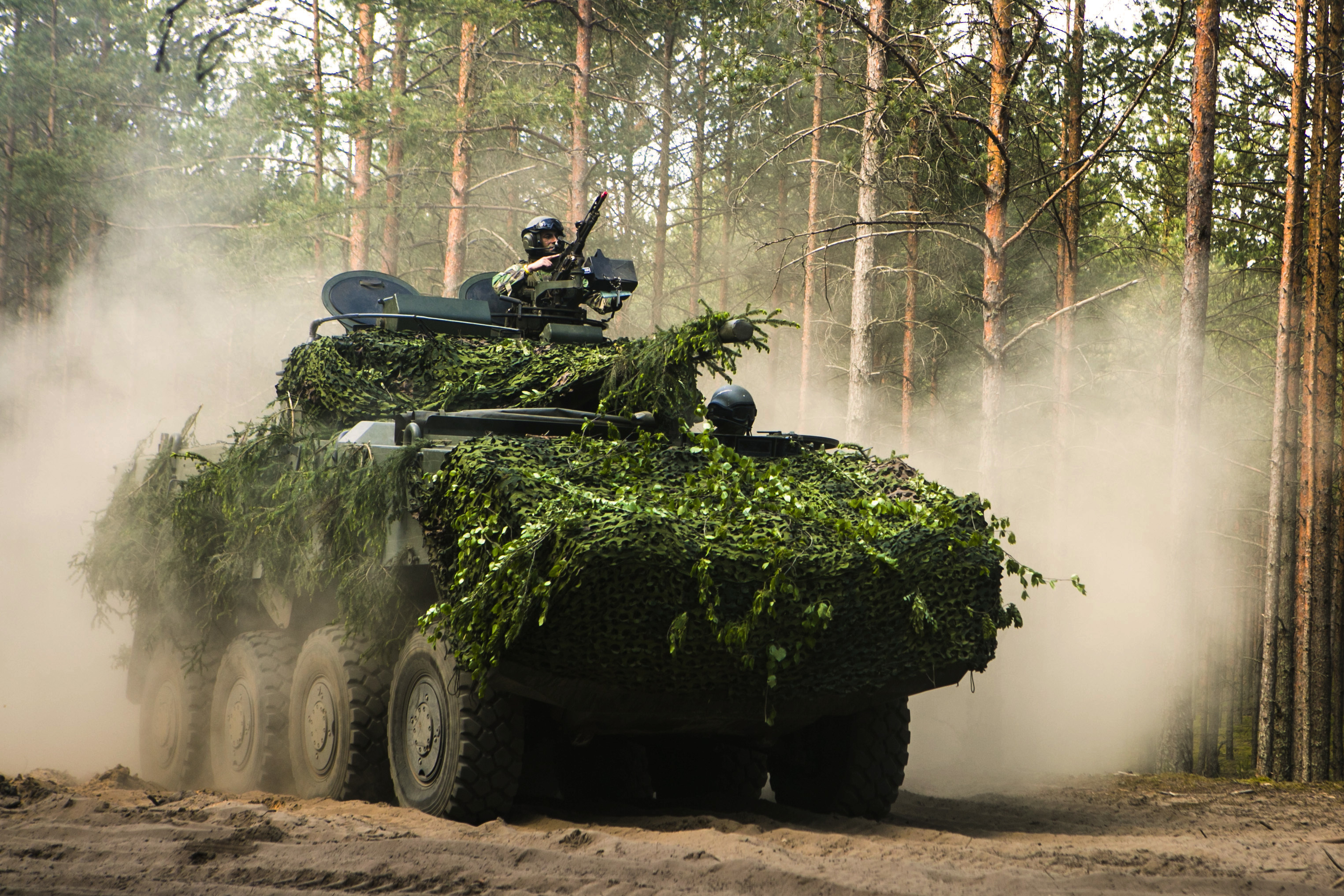
Pandur II armored vehicle of the Intervention Brigade

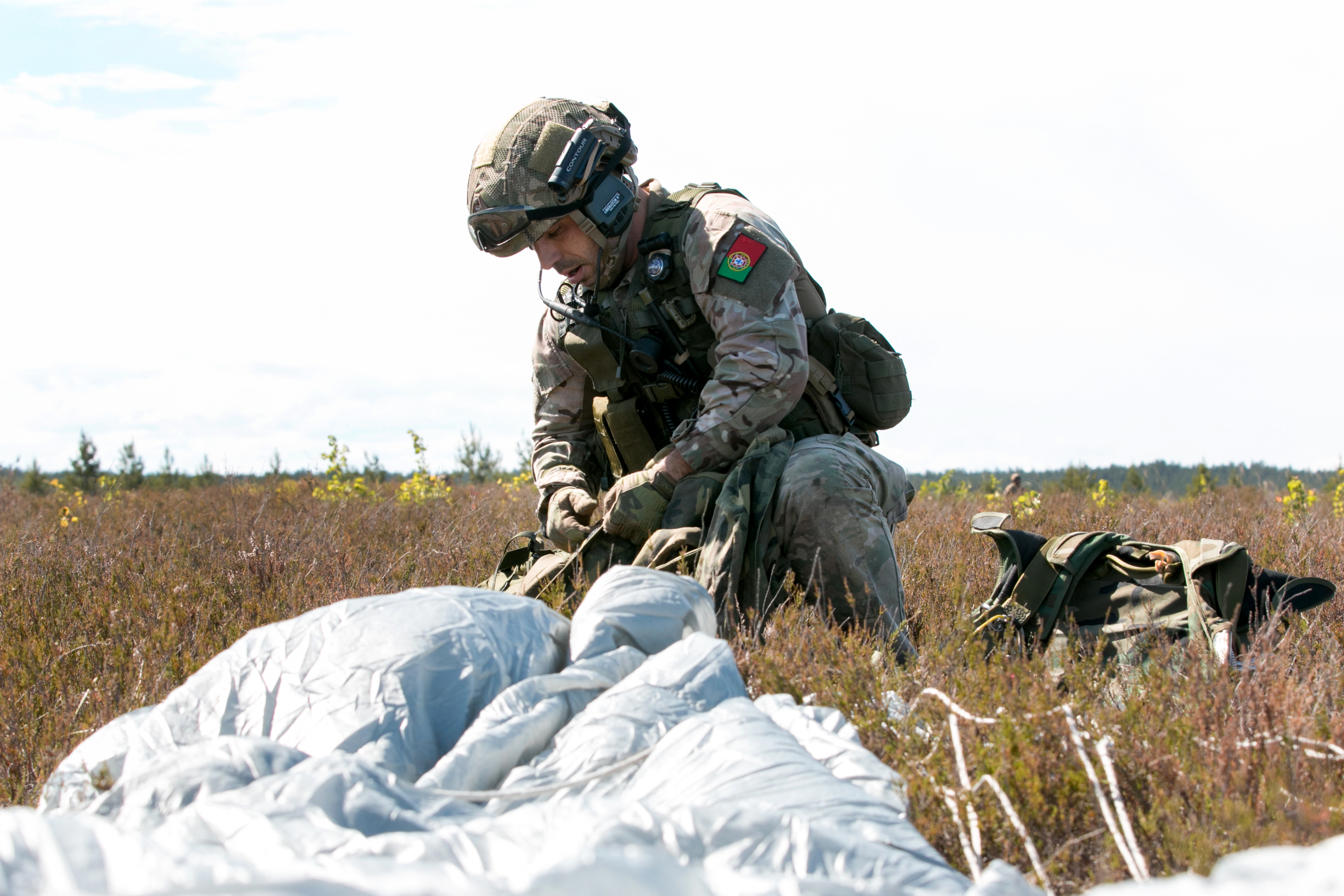
Paratrooper of the Rapid Reaction Brigade

1. The Land Forces Command (CFT);
2. The commands of the formations and operational units. The existing formation commands are:
  - Mechanized Brigade (BriMec) – this is the heavy brigade of the Portuguese Army. Its operational units include the Tank Group (Leopard 2A6), the Tracked Mechanized Infantry Battalion (M113 APC), a field artillery group (M109A5 howitzer), a reconnaissance squadron (Leopard 2A6, M901 ITV and M113 APC), an anti-aircraft artillery battery (MIM-72 Chaparral), the Heavy Combat Engineers Company, a signal company and a service support battalion. This formation has an exceptional administrative organization, which is characterized by its operational units being separate and not part of regiments as usual and being all concentrated in the same location (the Santa Margarida Military Camp);
  - Intervention Brigade (BrigInt) – this is the medium brigade of the Army. It was originally a motorized infantry formation, but evolved to a light mechanized brigade, when it was equipped with the several versions of the Portuguese Pandur wheeled armored vehicles. Its operational units include the Armored Car Group (Commando V-150 and Pandur II), the 1st Wheeled Mechanized Infantry Battalion (Pandur II), the 2nd Wheeled Mechanized Infantry Battalion (Pandur II), a field artillery group (M114 155 mm howitzer), an anti-aircraft artillery battery (FIM-92 Stinger), an engineers company, a signal company and a service support battalion. Its operational units are barracked in several regiments and other base units across the country (in Braga, Chaves, Coimbra, Espinho, Porto, Queluz, Vila Real, Viseu and Vendas Novas) with most of these being administratively under the control of the brigade;
  - Rapid Reaction Brigade (BriRR) – this is a special forces brigade. It was originally a fully airborne brigade, with most of its personnel being paratrooper-qualified (including the members of combat support and service support units). It has no longer that feature, now including other types of units beyond those of paratroopers, including the two other special forces of the Army (Commandos and Special Operations). It also used to include the Army Light Aviation Unit, until its disbandment due to the cancelation of the planned acquisition of helicopters to the Army. Its operational units presently include the 1st Paratrooper Infantry Battalion, the 2nd Paratrooper Infantry Battalion, the Commando Battalion, the Special Operations Force, a field artillery group (L118 Light Gun), a reconnaissance squadron (Panhard VBL), an anti-aircraft battery (FIM-92 Stinger), the Air-Land Operational Battalion, an engineers company, a signal company and a support unit. Its operational units are barracked in several regiments and other base units across the country (in São Jacinto, Lamego, Leiria, Tomar, Tancos, Beja, Queluz and Estremoz), with most of these being administratively under the control of the brigade.
3. The commands of military zone. The existing commands of this type are:
  - Azores Military Zone (ZMA) – its operational force is the Azores Military Zone Forces (FZMA), which includes the 1st FZMA Infantry Battalion, the 2nd FZMA Infantry Battalion and an anti-aircraft battery (Rheinmetall Rh 202 and FIM-92 Stinger). Its operational units are barracked in two garrison regiments (in Angra do Heroísmo and Ponta Delgada), administratively under the control of the Military Zone;
  - Madeira Military Zone (ZMM) – its operational force is the Madeira Military Zone Forces (FZMM), which includes an infantry battalion and an anti-aircraft battery (Rheinmetall Rh 202 and FIM-92 Stinger). Its operational units are barracked in a garrison regiment (in Funchal), administratively under the control of the Military Zone;
4. The general support and emergency military support forces. The operational units of these forces include an anti-aircraft artillery group, two Army Police squadrons, a civil-military cooperation company, an engineers battalion headquarters, three engineers companies, a psychological operations module, an ISTAR battalion, a bridge company, a CBN defense company, an EOD group of teams, a signal battalion headquarters, a general support signal company, an electronic warfare company, a resupply and services company, a target acquisition battery, a transport company, a surgical field hospital and a geospatial support unit. These operational units are barracked in several regiments and other base units across the country (Queluz, Lisbon, Espinho, Tancos, Porto, Póvoa de Varzim, Vendas Novas and Abrantes).

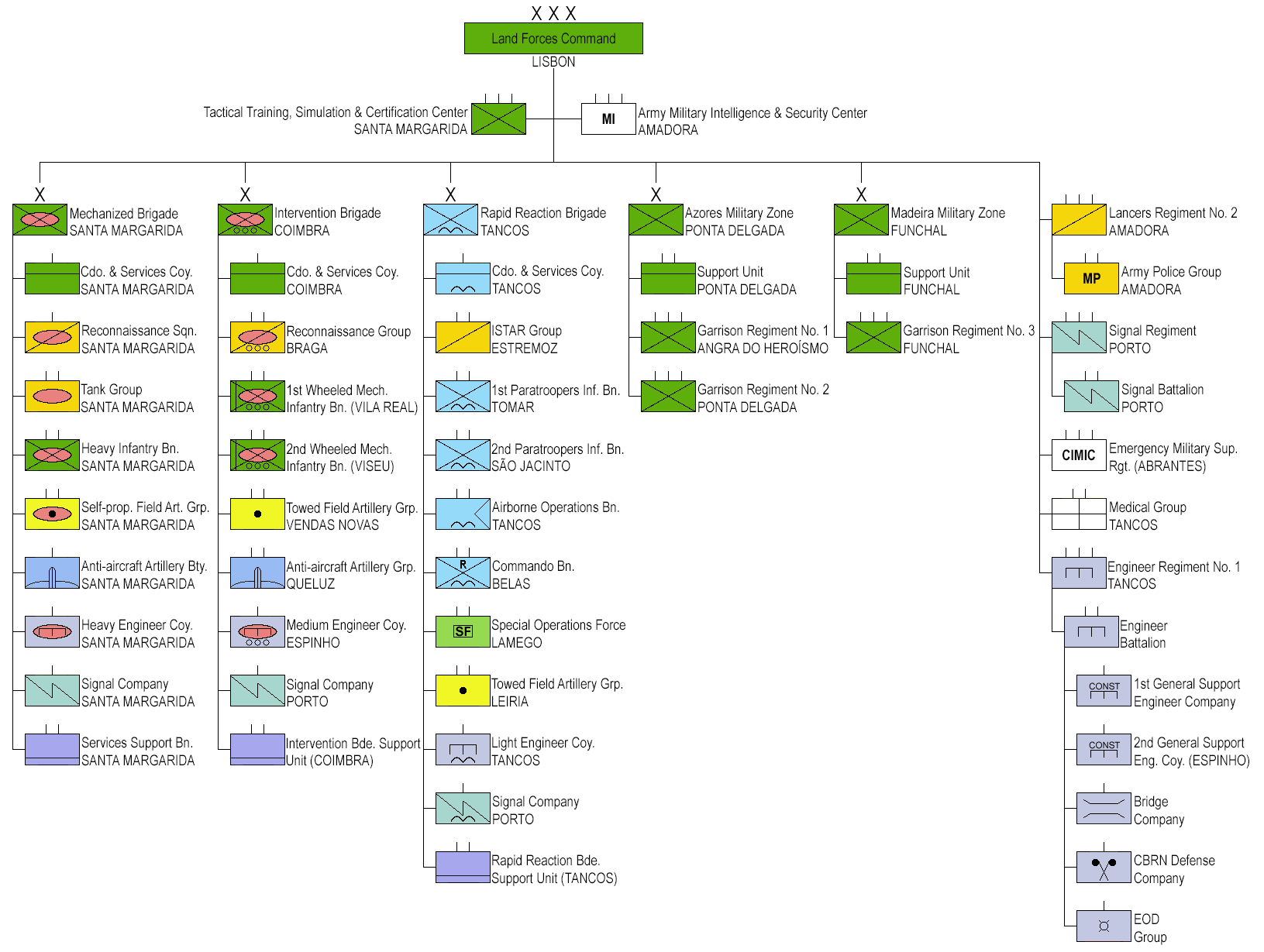
Portuguese Army Land Forces Command organization as of March 2026

== Uniform and insignia ==
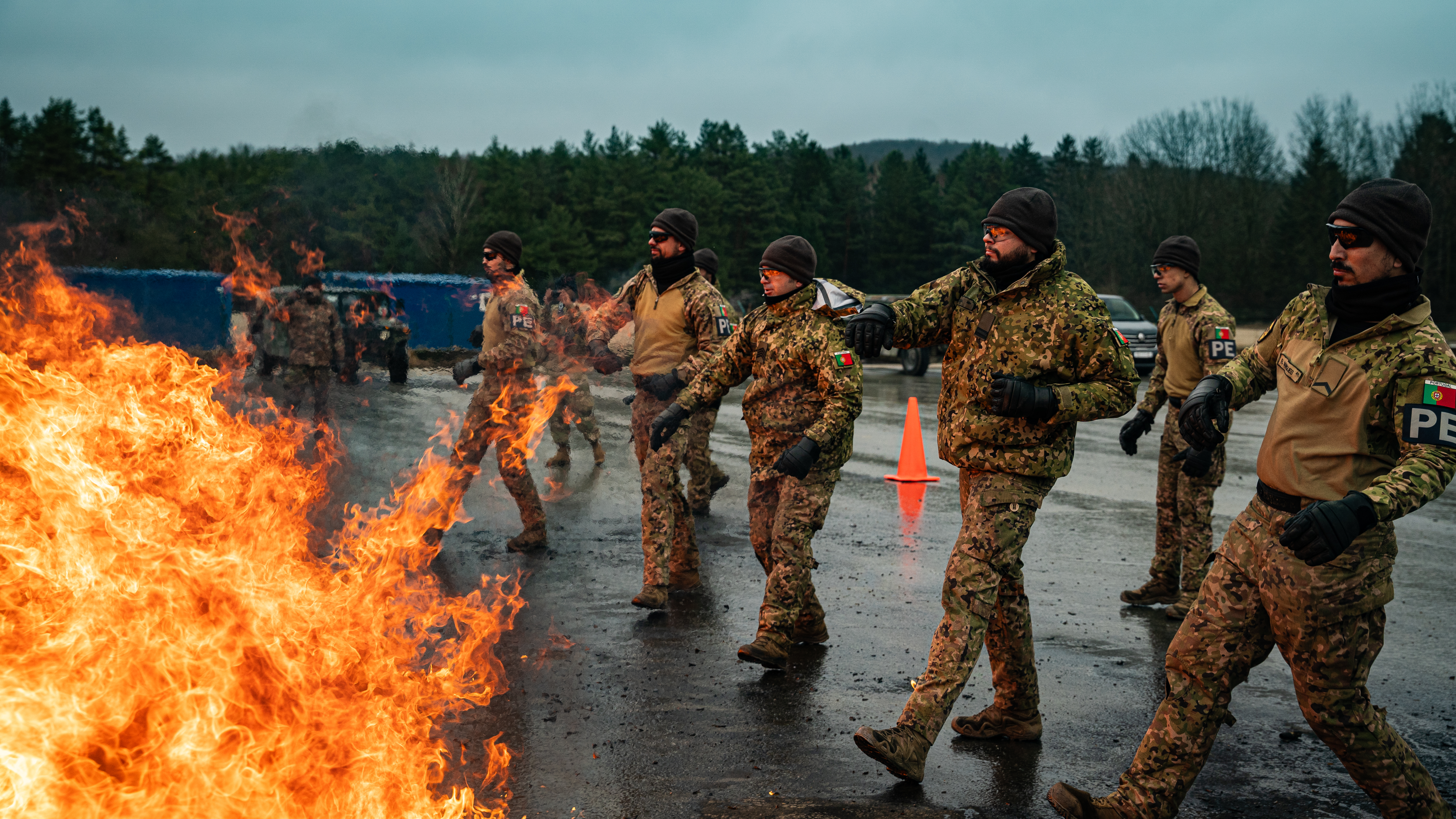
Soldiers of the 2nd Lancers Regiment equipped with the new camouflage of the Portuguese Army.

=== Uniform ===
The Portuguese Army types of uniforms are the following:

- Dress uniform (grande uniforme);
- Mess dress uniform (uniforme de jaqueta);
- Ceremonial uniform for the Army Band;
- Nº 1 Uniform – Service dress uniform;
- Nº 2 Uniform – Barrack dress uniform;
- Nº 3 Uniform – Combat dress uniform;
- Physical education uniform;
- Special uniforms.

=== Rank insignia ===
Officers

NATO code	OF-10	OF-9	OF-8	OF-7	OF-6	OF-5		OF-4	OF-3	OF-2	OF-1
Portuguese Army
Portuguese Army	Marechal do Exército	General	Tenente-general	Major-general	Brigadeiro-general	Coronel-tirocinado (Note: Colonel who has completed the General Officer training course. Between 1929 and 1937, the Coronel-tirocinado was called Brigadeiro.)	Coronel	Tenente-coronel	Major	Capitão	Tenente	Alferes

Enlisted

NATO code	OR-9		OR-8	OR-7	OR-6	OR-5		OR-4	OR-3	OR-2		OR-1
Portuguese Army
Portuguese Army	Sargento-mor	Sargento-chefe	Sargento-ajudante	Primeiro-sargento	Segundo-sargento	Furriel	Segundo-furriel	Cabo de secção	Cabo-adjunto	Primeiro-cabo	Segundo-cabo	Soldado

== Equipment ==
The Portuguese Army infantry essentially uses the Glock 17 Gen 5 pistols, FN SCAR L STD assault rifles in 5.56mm caliber and FN Minimi Mk3 machine guns as light weapons, except for the Special Operations Troops Centre which uses Heckler & Koch HK416A5 rifles.

Main armored combat vehicles used are the Leopard 2 A6 main battle tanks, M113A1/A2 tracked armored vehicles, Pandur II and URO VAMTAC ST5 wheeled armored vehicles.

Main combat equipment as of 1 January 2026:

- 34 main battle tanks;
- 26 tank destroyers;
- 443 IFV and APC vehicles;
- 224 light armoured vehicles;
- 79 artillery systems (155mm and 105mm howitzers).
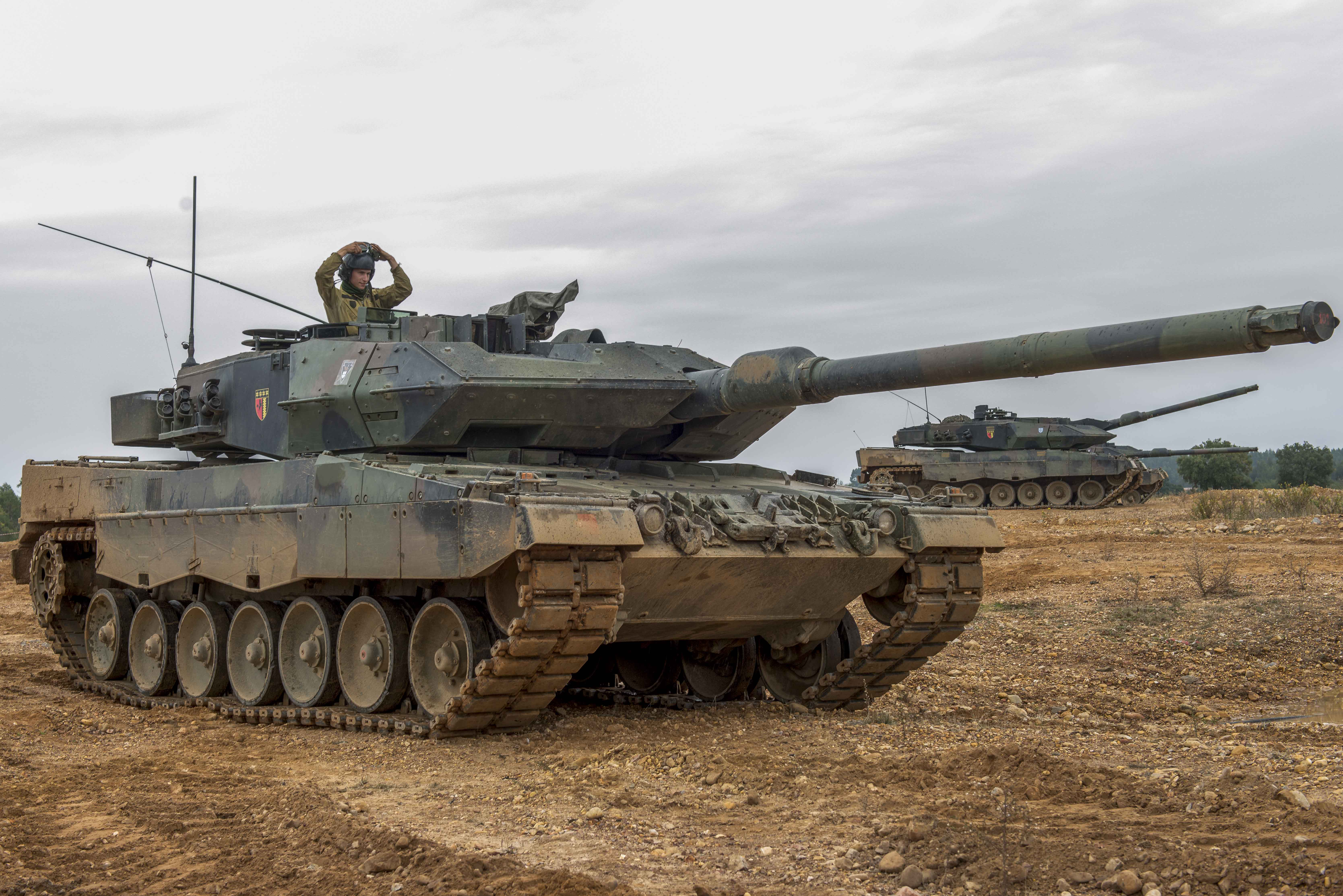
Leopard 2A6 main battle tank of the Mechanized Brigade

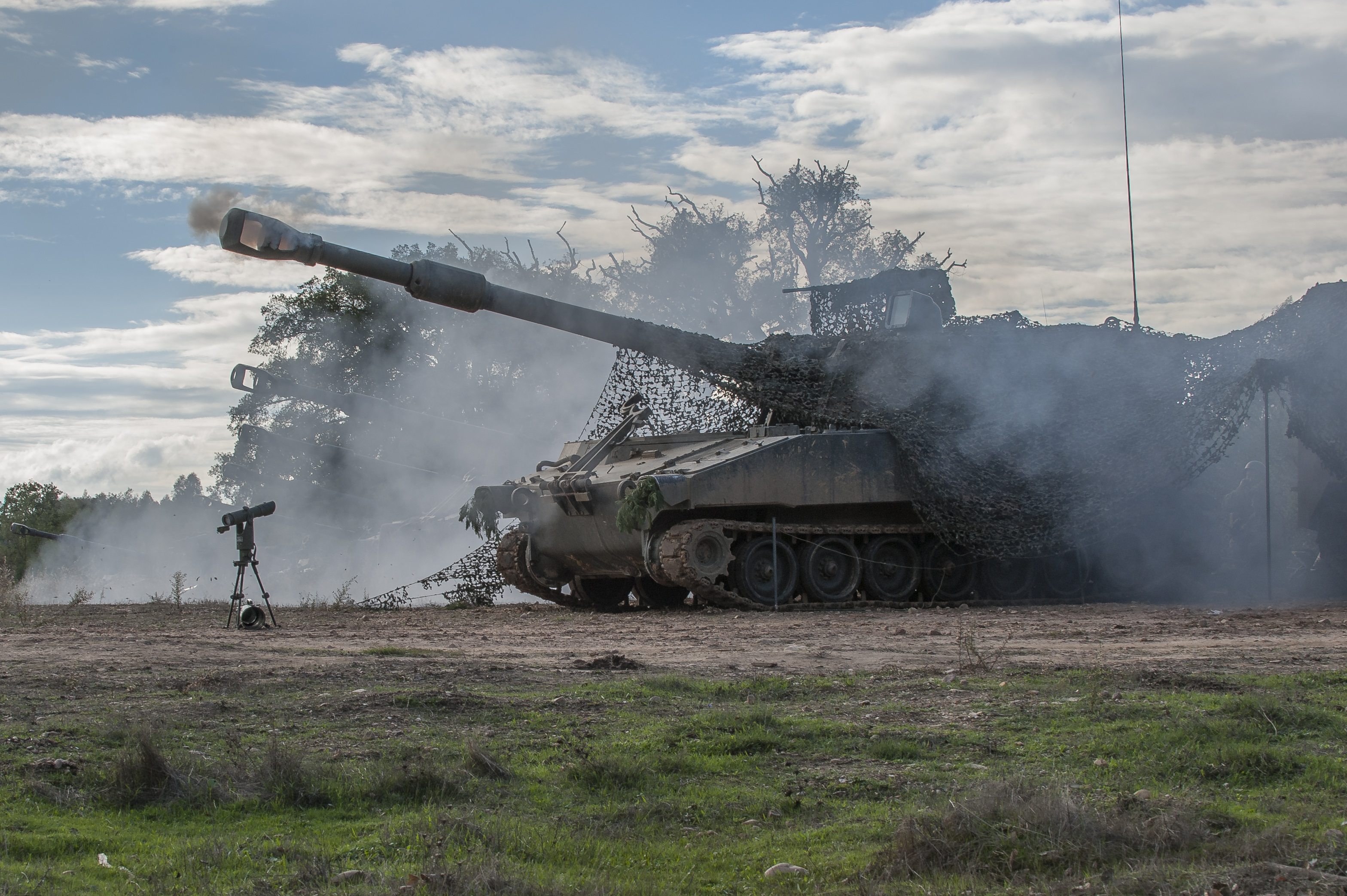
M109A5 self-propelled howitzer of the Mechanized Brigade

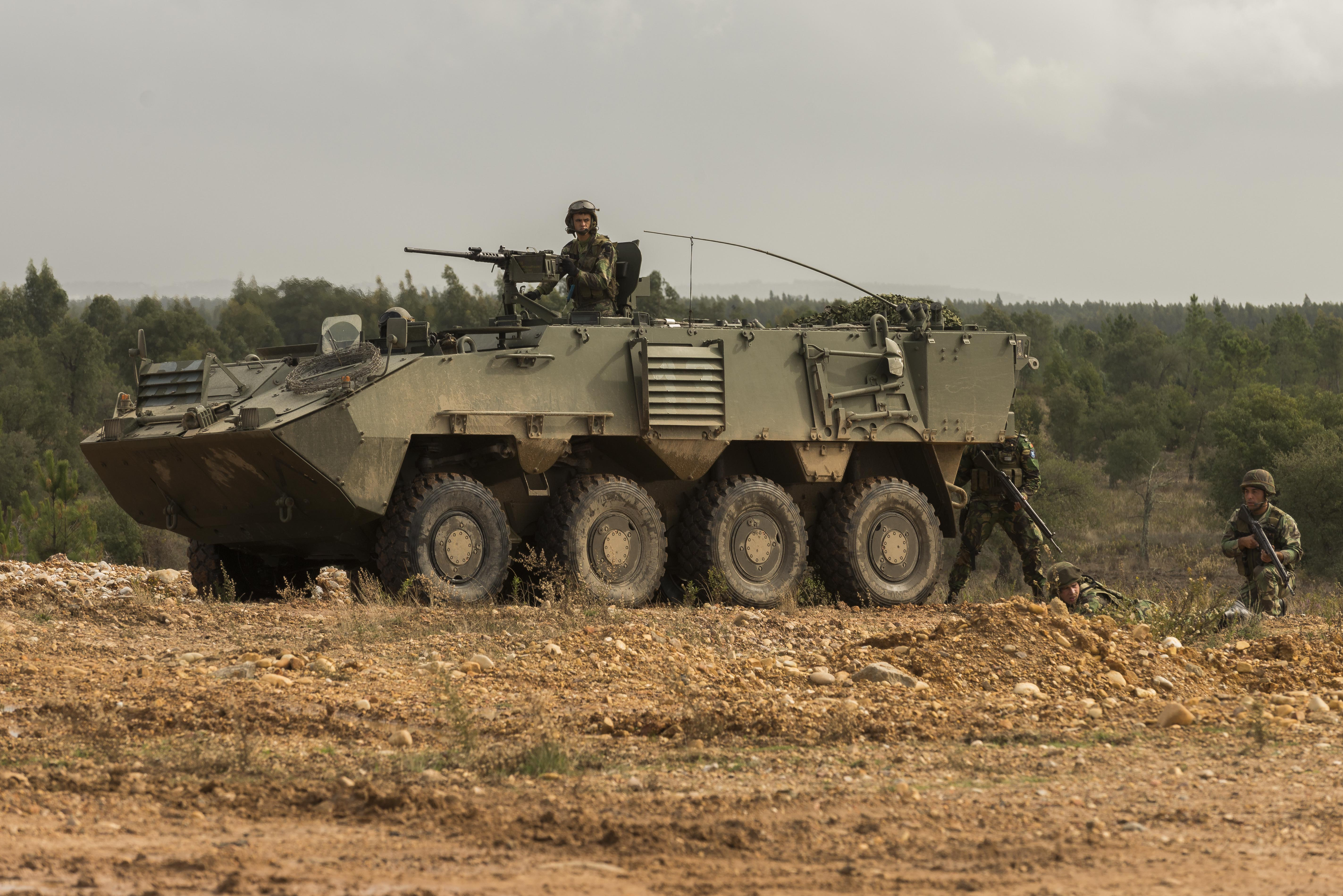
Portuguese Pandur II of the Intervention Brigade

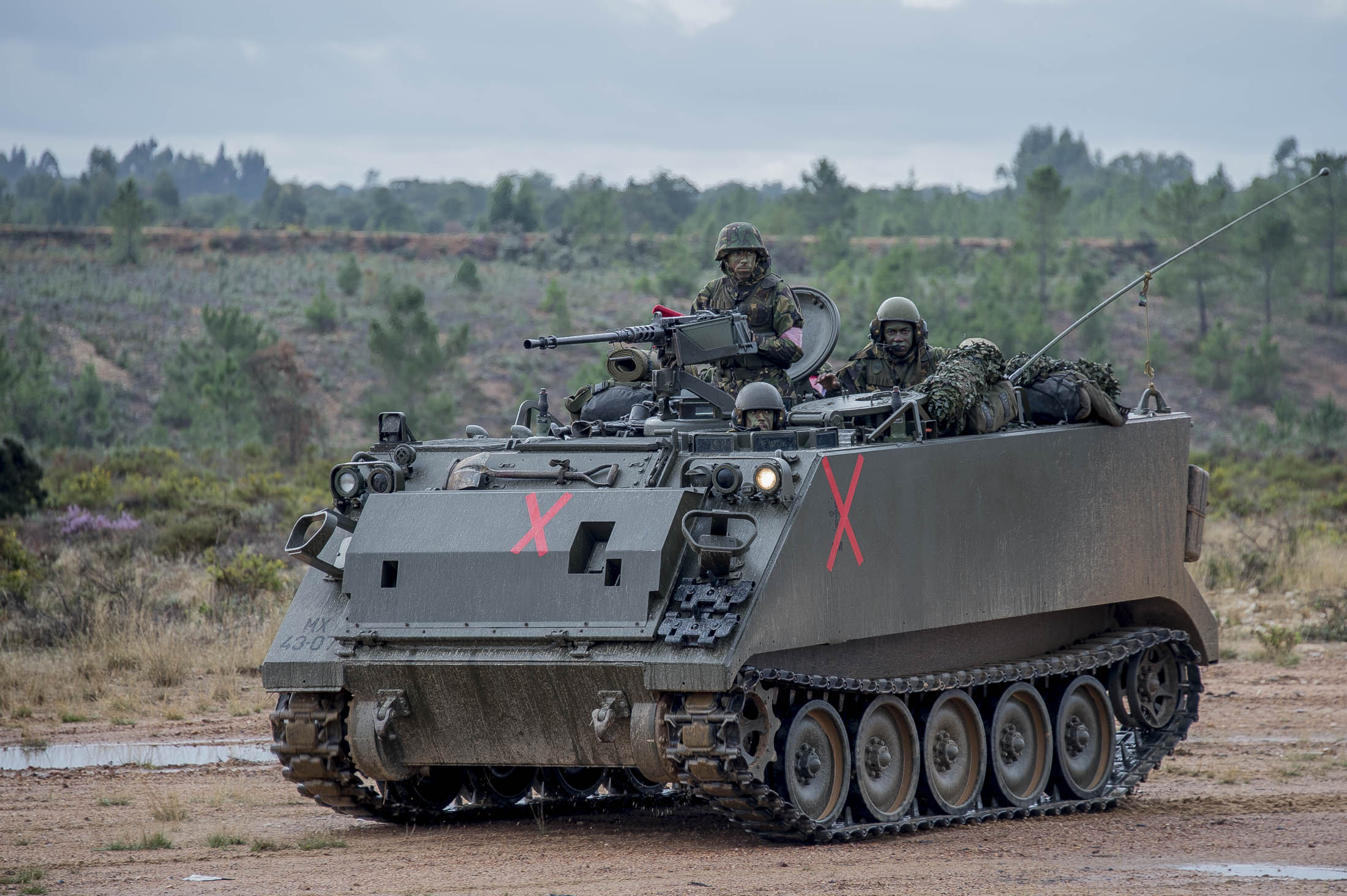
M113A2 of the Portuguese Mechanized Brigade

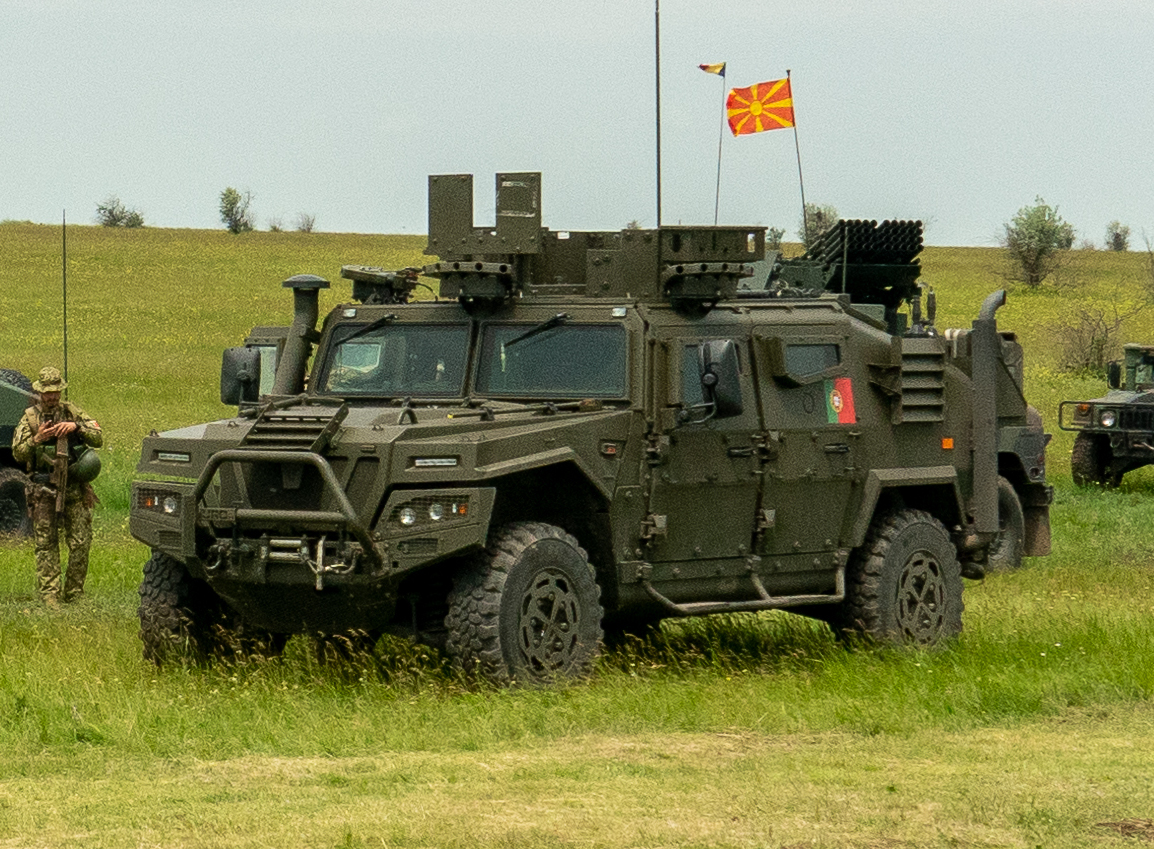
URO VAMTAC ST5, is new light armored vehicle of the Portuguese Army.

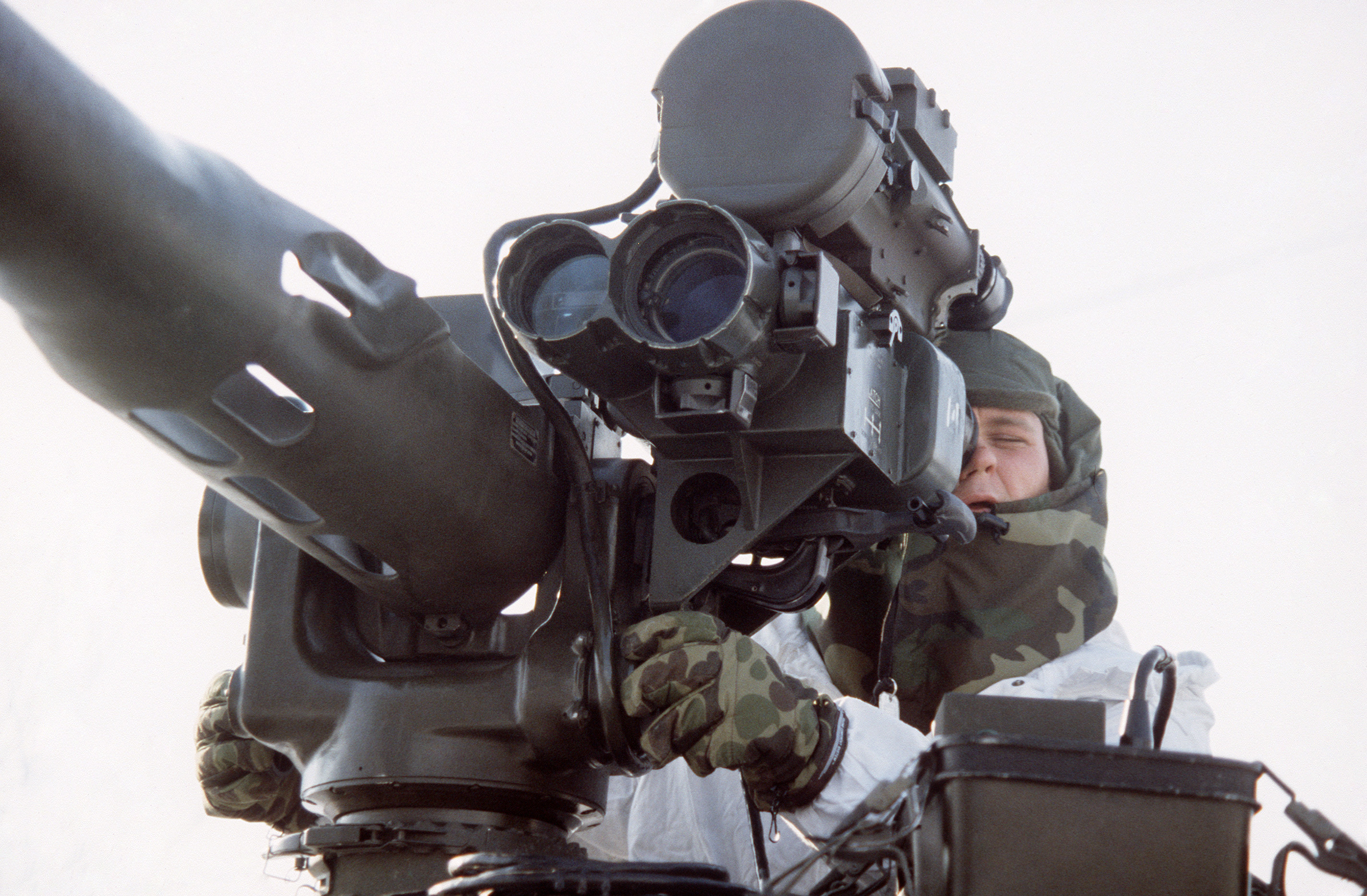
TOW is an anti-tank guided missile used by the Portuguese Army.

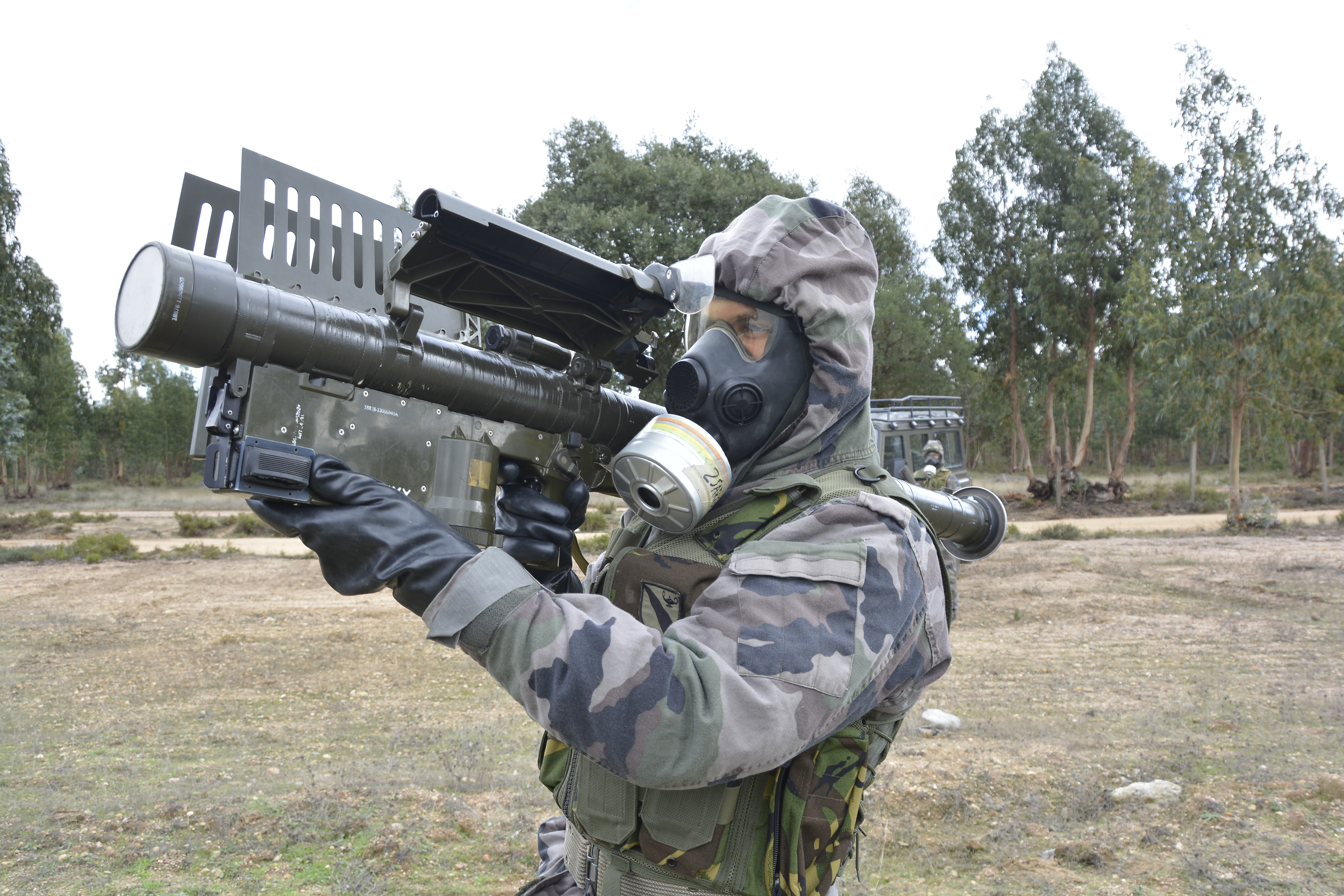
FIM-92 Stinger is the only man-portable air-defense system operated by the Portuguese Army.

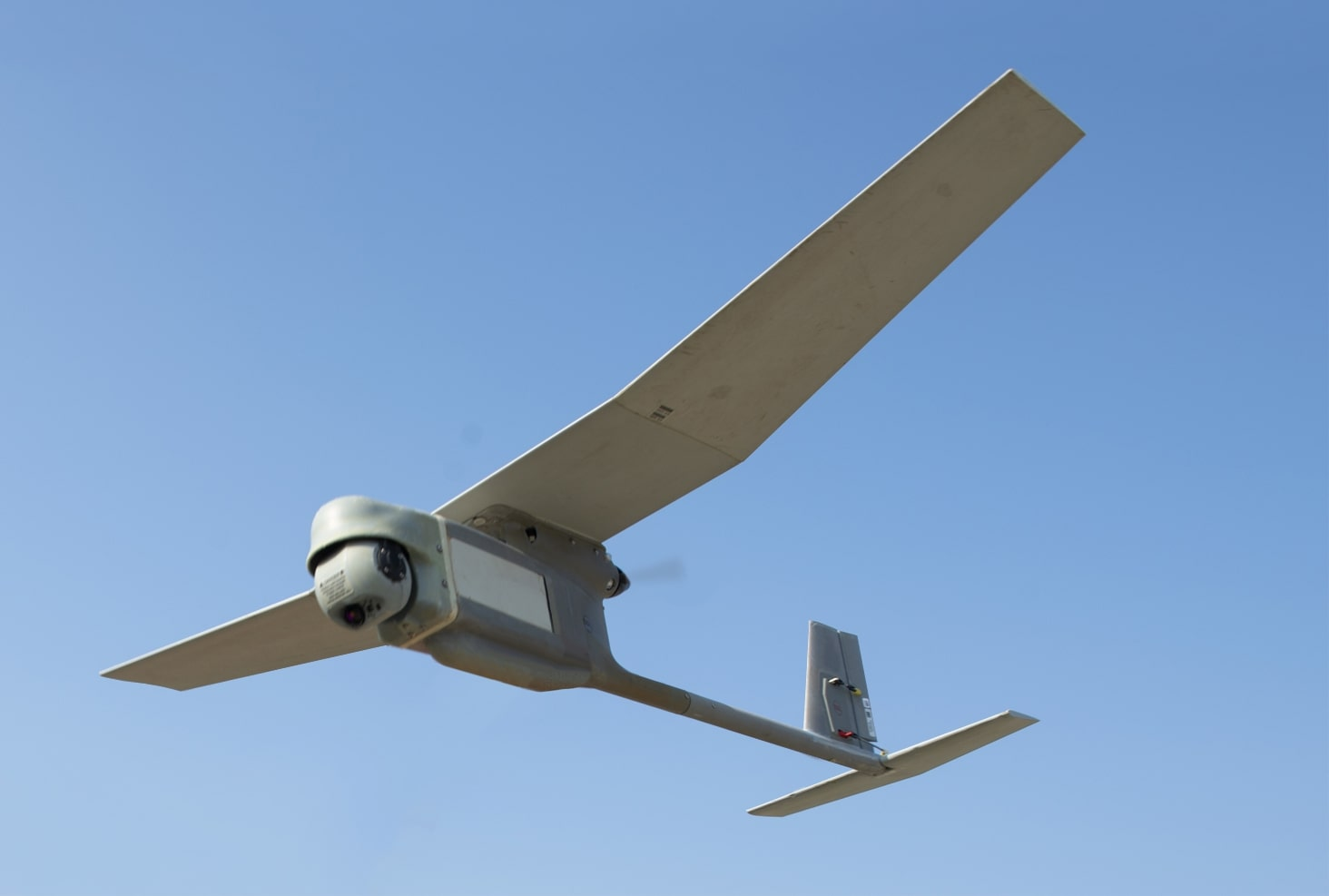
AeroVironment RQ-11 Raven is the main unmanned aerial vehicle used for surveillance missions.

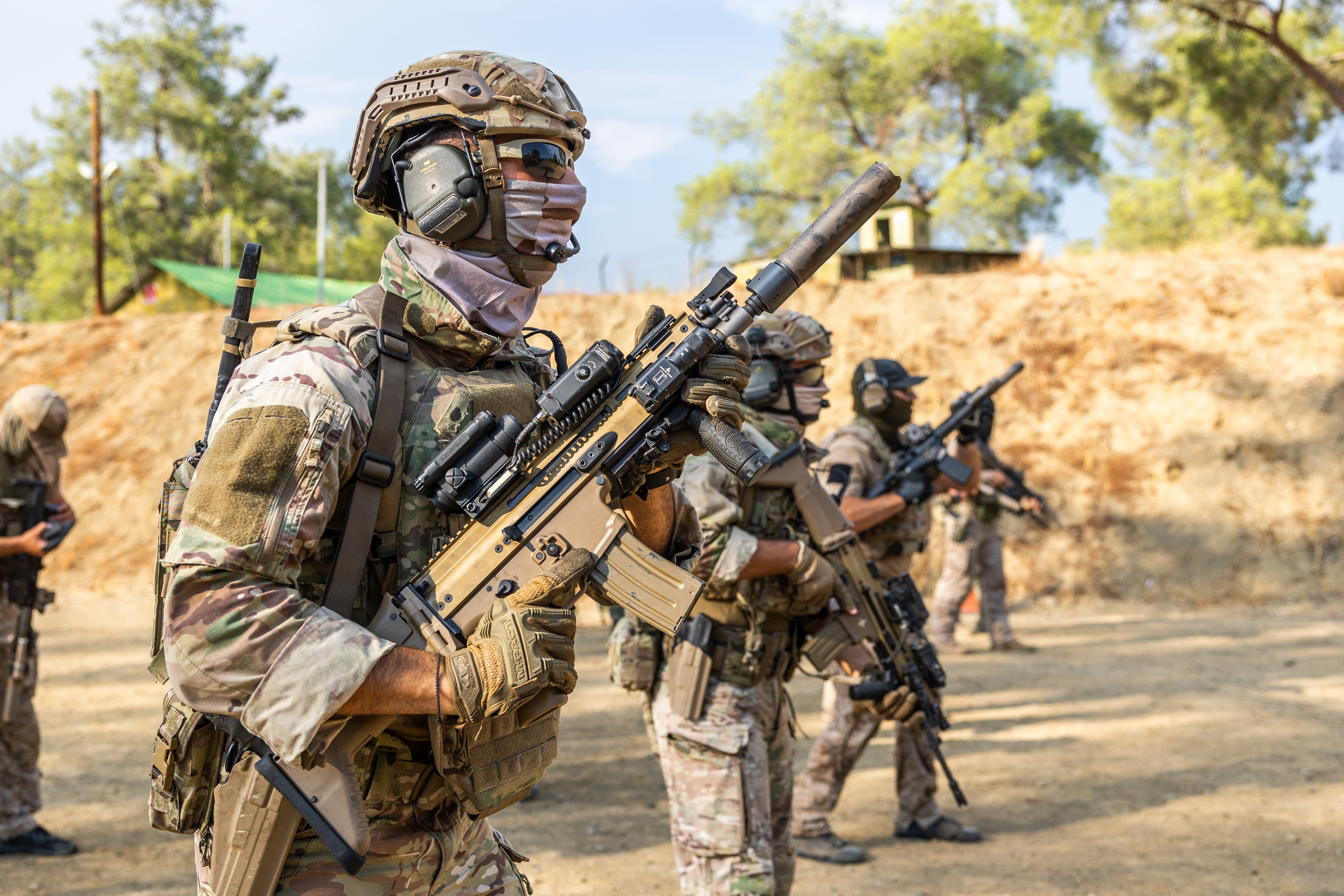
FN SCAR STD is the service rifle of the Portuguese Army since 2019

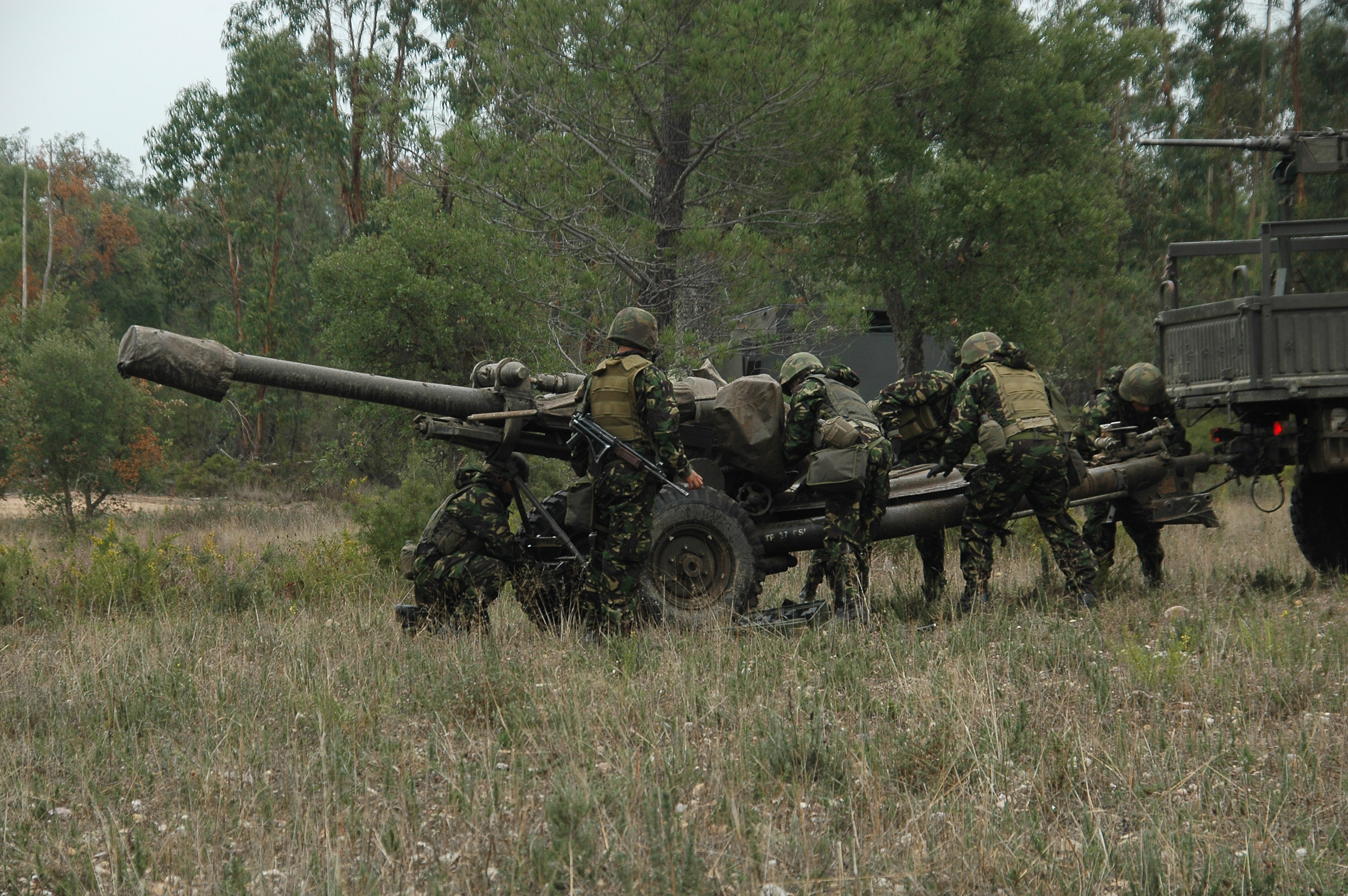
L118 light gun towed howitzer of the Rapid Reaction Brigade

== See also ==
- Military history of Portugal
- Portuguese Military Academy
- Army Special Operations
- Portuguese Paratroopers
- Parachute Troops School
- Rapid Reaction Brigade
- Ordenanças
