= List of units of the Portuguese Army =

Below follows a List of the active units of the Portuguese Army sorted by corps and with their subunits and locations:

== Infantry ==
- 1st Infantry Regiment (Regimento de Infantaria nº 1) in Beja
  - Command and Service Company (Supply & Services Platoon, Garrison & Security Platoon, Transport & Maintenance Section, CIS Section, Medical Section)
  - Training Company
  - Tavira Detachment (Supply & Services Platoon, Garrison & Security Platoon, Transport & Maintenance Section, CIS Section, Medical Section)
- 10th Infantry Regiment (Regimento de Infantaria nº 10) in Aveiro
  - Command and Service Company (General Services Platoon, Garrison & Security Platoon, Transport & Supply Platoon, Maintenance Section, CIS Section, Medical Section)
  - 2nd Parachute Infantry Battalion for the Rapid Reaction Brigade
    - Parachute Command and Support Company
    - 21st Parachute Infantry Company
    - 22nd Parachute Infantry Company
    - 23rd Parachute Infantry Company
- 13th Infantry Regiment (Regimento de Infantaria nº 13) in Vila Real
  - Command and Service Company (General Services Platoon, Garrison & Security Platoon, Transport & Supply Platoon, Maintenance Section, CIS Section, Medical Section)
  - 1st Mechanized Infantry Battalion for the Intervention Brigade
    - Command and Support Company
    - 3x Mechanized Rifles Companies with Pandur II armored personnel carriers
      - Combat Support Company with MILAN anti-tank missiles and heavy mortars
- 14th Infantry Regiment (Regimento de Infantaria nº 14) in Viseu
  - Command and Service Company (General Services Platoon, Garrison & Security Platoon, Transport & Supply Platoon, Maintenance Section, CIS Section, Medical Section)
  - 2nd Mechanized Infantry Battalion for the Intervention Brigade
    - Command and Support Company
    - 3x Mechanized Rifles Companies with Pandur II armored personnel carriers
    - Combat Support Company MILAN anti-tank missiles and heavy mortars
- 15th Infantry Regiment (Regimento de Infantaria nº 15) in Tomar
  - Command and Service Company (General Services Platoon, Garrison & Security Platoon, Transport & Supply Platoon, Maintenance Section, CIS Section, Medical Section)
  - 1st Parachute Infantry Battalion for the Rapid Reaction Brigade
    - Parachute Command and Support Company
    - 11th Parachute Infantry Company
    - 12th Parachute Infantry Company
    - 13th Parachute Infantry Company
- 19th Infantry Regiment (Regimento de Infantaria nº 19) in Chaves
  - Command and Service Company (General Services Platoon, Garrison & Security Platoon, Transport & Supply Platoon, Maintenance Section, CIS Section, Medical Section)
  - Service Support Battalion for the Intervention Brigade
- Commando Regiment in Belas
  - Command and Service Company
  - Training Company
  - Commando Battalion for the Rapid Reaction Brigade
    - Command and Support Company
    - 3x Commando Companies
- Paratroopers Regiment in Tancos
  - Command and Service Company
  - Training Battalion
    - Terrestrial Training Company
    - Aeroterrestrial Training Company
  - Aeroterrestrial Operations Battalion for the Rapid Reaction Brigade
    - Pathfinder Company
    - Aerial Equipment Company
    - Aerial Supply Company
    - Service Company
- Special Operations Troops Centre in Lamego
  - Command and Service Company
  - Training Company
  - Special Operations Forces for the Rapid Reaction Brigade

== Cavalry ==
- 2nd Lancers Regiment (Regimento de Lanceiros nº 2) in Amadora
  - Command and Service Group
    - Command Squadron (CIS Centre, Garrison & Security Platoon, CIS Section, Information Security Section, Information Systems Section)
    - Service Squadron (Supply & Services Platoon, Maintenance & Transport Section, Depot Section)
  - Military Police Group
    - Support Platoon (Supply Section, CIS Section, Medical Section, Maintenance Section, Motorbike Section)
    - 2x Military Police Squadrons
- 3rd Cavalry Regiment (Regimento de Cavalaria nº 3) in Estremoz
  - Command and Support Squadron (Logistic Section, CIS Section)
  - Reconnaissance Group with Véhicule Blindé Léger
    - Command and Service Squadron (Maintenance & Transport Platoon, Signal Platoon, Medical Platoon)
    - Reconnaissance Squadron for the Rapid Reaction Brigade
    - Training Squadron
- 6th Cavalry Regiment (Regimento de Cavalaria nº 6) in Braga
  - Command and Service Squadron (General Services Platoon, Garrison & Security Platoon, Maintenance & Transport Section, CIS Section)
  - Reconnaissance Group
    - Command and Support Squadron (Maintenance & Transport Platoon, Signal Platoon, Medical Platoon)
    - Reconnaissance Squadron for the Intervention Brigade
    - Reconnaissance Squadron (General Support)
    - Fire Support Squadron for the Intervention Brigade with Commando V150 armored vehicles
    - Support Squadron (Anti-tank missile Platoon, Heavy Mortar Platoon, Battlefield Surveillance Section, UAV Section)

== Artillery ==
- 1st Anti-Aircraft Artillery Regiment (Regimento de Artilharia Antiaérea nº 1) in Queluz
  - Command and Service Battery (General Services Platoon, Garrison & Security Platoon, Transport & Supply Platoon, CIS Section, Medical Section)
  - Anti-Aircraft Artillery Group
    - Command and Support Battery
    - Anti-Aircraft Artillery Battery (General Support) with Stinger surface-to-air missiles
    - Anti-Aircraft Artillery Battery for the Intervention Brigade with Stinger surface-to-air missiles
    - Anti-Aircraft Artillery Battery for the Rapid Reaction Brigade with Stinger surface-to-air missiles
    - HIMAD Battery with MIM-72A3 Chaparral surface-to-air missiles
    - Radar Section with PSTAR radars
- 4th Artillery Regiment (Regimento de Artilharia nº 4) in Leiria
  - Command and Service Battery (General Services Platoon, Garrison & Security Platoon, Transport & Supply Platoon, CIS Section, Medical Section, Maintenance Section)
  - Field Artillery Group for the Rapid Reaction Brigade
    - Command and Support Battery (Target Acquisition Platoon, Transport & Supply Platoon, Maintenance Platoon, Signal Platoon, Medical Section)
    - 3x Fires Batteries with L118 105 mm howitzers
    - 1x Heavy Mortar Battery with Tampella 120mm mortars
- 5th Artillery Regiment (Regimento de Artilharia nº 5) in Vendas Novas
  - Command and Service Battery (General Services Platoon, Garrison & Security Platoon, Transport & Supply Platoon, CIS Section, Medical Section, Maintenance Section)
  - Field Artillery Group for the Intervention Brigade
    - Command and Support Battery (Target Acquisition Platoon, Transport & Supply Platoon, Maintenance Platoon, Signal Platoon, Medical Section)
    - 2x Fires Batteries with M114 155 mm howitzers

== Engineers ==
- 1st Engineer Regiment (Regimento de Engenharia nº 1) in Tancos
  - Command and Service Company (General Services Platoon, Garrison & Security Platoon, Transport & Supply Platoon, CIS Section, Medical Section)
  - Engineer Battalion
    - Command and Support Company
    - 1st Engineer Company (General Support)
    - Engineer Company for the Rapid Reaction Brigade
    - CBRN defense Company
    - Bridging Company
    - EOD Group
- 3rd Engineer Regiment (Regimento de Engenharia nº 3) in Espinho
  - Command and Service Company (General Services Platoon, Garrison & Security Platoon, Transport & Supply Platoon, CIS Section, Medical Section)
  - Engineer Battalion
    - Command and Support Company
    - Engineer Company for the Intervention Brigade
    - 2nd Engineer Company (General Support)

== Garrison regiments ==
- 1st Garrison Regiment (Regimento de Guarnição nº 1) in Angra do Heroismo
  - Command and Service Company
  - 1st Infantry Battalion
    - Command & Support Company
    - 1st Rifle Company
    - 2nd Rifle Company
- 2nd Garrison Regiment (Regimento de Guarnição nº 2) in Ponta Delgada
  - Command and Service Company
  - Training Company
  - Anti-Aircraft Artillery Battery with Rh 202 20mm twin mounted anti-aircraft guns
  - 2nd Infantry Battalion
    - Command & Support Company
    - 1st Rifle Company
    - 2nd Rifle Company
    - Combat Support Company
- 3rd Garrison Regiment (Regimento de Guarnição nº 3) in Funchal
  - Command and Service Company
  - Training Company
  - Anti-Aircraft Artillery Battery with Rh 202 20mm twin mounted anti-aircraft guns
  - Infantry Battalion
    - Command & Support Company
    - 1st Rifle Company

== Other units ==
- Signal Regiment (Regimento de Transmissões) in Porto
  - Command and Service Company (Supply & Services Platoon, Garrison & Security Platoon, Maintenance & Transport Section, CIS Section, Medical Section)
  - CIS Detachment North (CIS Section, Information Security Section, Equipment Section)
  - Electronic Warfare Training Center
  - Electronic Warfare Company
  - Signal Battalion
    - Signal Company for the Intervention Brigade
    - Signal Company (General Support)
- Maintenance Regiment (Regimento de Manutenção) in Entroncamento
  - Command and Service Company (General Services Platoon, Garrison & Security Platoon, Transport & Supply Platoon, CIS Section, Medical Section)
  - Training Company
  - Maintenance Battalion
    - Maintenance Company for the Intervention Brigade
    - Maintenance Company for the Rapid Reaction Brigade
    - Maintenance Company (General Support)
    - Materiel Inspection Platoon
- Transport Regiment (Regimento de Transportes) in Lisbon
  - Command and Service Company (General Services Platoon, Garrison & Security Platoon, Transport & Supply Platoon, CIS Section, Medical Section)
  - Transport Battalion
    - Transport Company
    - Personnel Transport Company
    - Movement Control Platoon
- RAME – Emergency Military Support Regiment, Abrantes
- CSMIE – Army Intelligence and Military Security Center, Lisbon
- CIGeoE – Army Geospatial Intelligence Center, Lisbon
- UAGME – Army Materiel General Support Unit, Alcochete
- CSMC – Coimbra Military Health Center, Coimbra
- CSMTSM – Tancos/Santa Margarida Military Health Center, Santa Margarida da Coutada

== Mechanized Brigade ==
The Mechanized Brigade differs from the army's other two brigades as its units aren't provided by regiments. All units of the Mechanized Brigade are part of the Mechanized Brigade at all times and are all based at the Santa Margarida Camp. The following units are part of the Mechanized Brigade:

- Mechanized Brigade in Santa Margarida
  - Command and Service Company
  - Tank Group with two squadrons of Leopard 2A6
  - 1st Heavy Infantry Battalion with M113 armored personnel carrier
  - Field Artillery Group with M109A5 155 mm self-propelled howitzers
  - Reconnaissance Squadron
  - Anti-Aircraft Artillery Battery with MIM-72A3 Chaparral surface-to-air missiles
  - Engineer Company
  - Signal Company
  - Service Support Battalion
