= ISTAR Battalion (Portugal) =

ISTAR Battalion Batalhão ISTAR
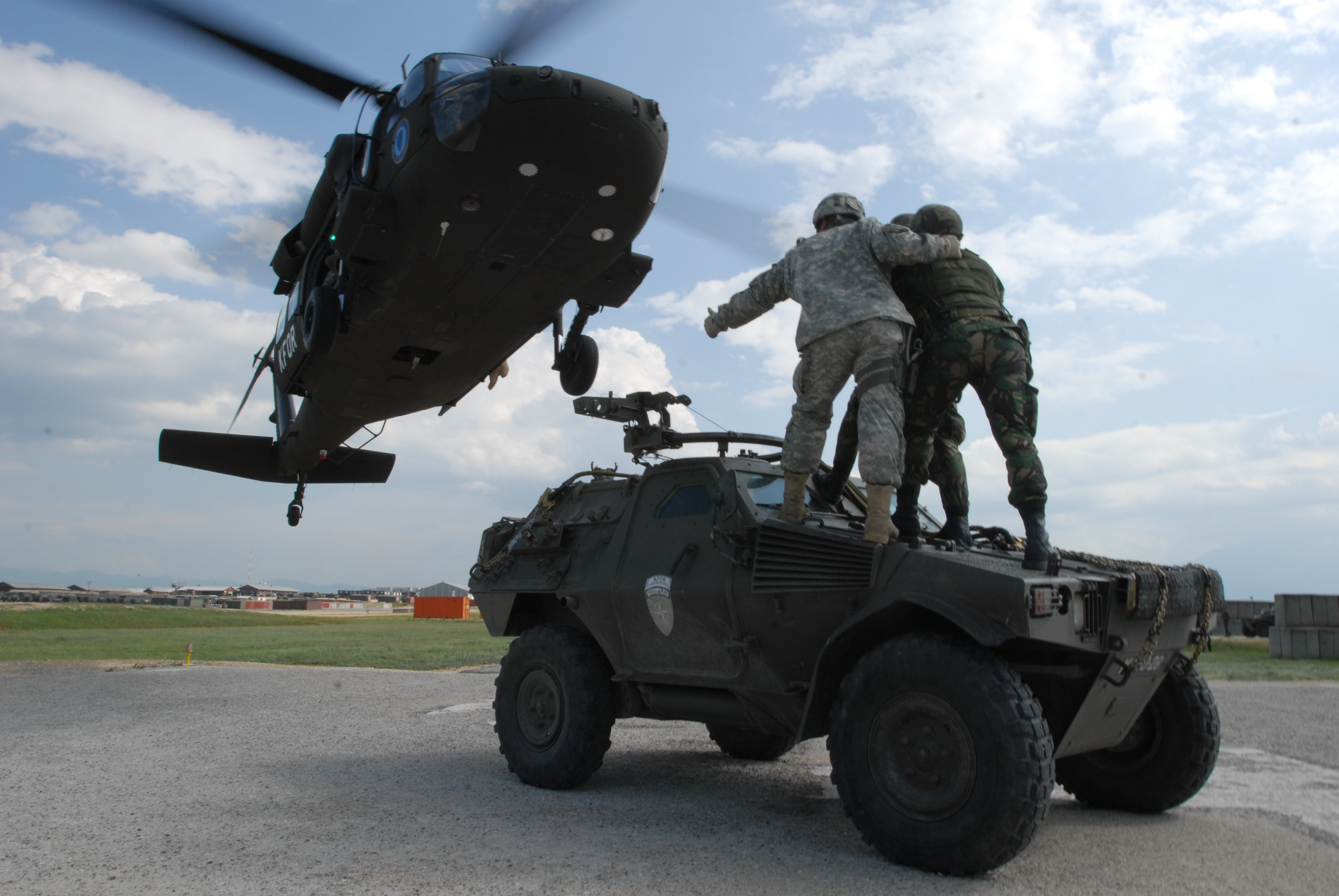
- Portuguese soldiers from the ISTAR Battalian hook their Panhard VBL to a UH-60 Blackhawk.
- Active: 2009
- Country: Portugal
- Branch: Army
- Role: Intelligence, surveillance, target acquisition and reconnaissance
- Size: Battalion
- Part of: Army General Support Forces
- Garrison: Vendas Novas, Porto, Lisbon
- Equipment: AeroVironment RQ-11 Raven, AN/TPQ-36 Firefinder radar, RATC-S Mobile target finder radar, MARWIN MW12 weather station

The ISTAR Battalion (BISTAR, Batalhão ISTAR in Portuguese) is the Portuguese Army unit responsible for centralizing the intelligence, surveillance, target acquisition and reconnaissance (ISTAR) missions.

The ISTAR started to be raised in 2009, following NATO requisites and the need felt by the Portuguese Army to develop the capability to give ISTAR support to its operational brigades and to its deployed forces in foreign territory.

== Organization ==
The BISTAR is organized as command element and aggregating unit, being made up with the grouping of sub-units specialized in the different ISTAR capabilities, which are raised by several other units. It includes:

1. Headquarters and Headquarters Company;
2. C2 Company;
3. Electronic Warfare Company;
4. HUMINT Platoon;
5. Reconnaissance Platoon;
6. Unattended Ground Sensor Section;
7. Low Altitude Medium Endurance UAV Platoon;
8. Weapon Locating Platoon;
9. Weapon Locating Accousting Sensor Platoon;
10. Forward Observers Platoon..

== Units ==
- 3rd Cavalry Regiment – Reconnaissance Squadron;
  - 1st Reconnaissance Platoon (1PelRec);
  - 2nd Reconnaissance Platoon (2PelRec);
  - Medium Mortar Platoon (PelMortMed);
  - Transmissions Section (SecTm);
  - Battlefield Surveillance Section (SecVCB);
  - Maintenance Section (SecMan);
  - Refueling Section (SecReab);
  - Sanitary Section (SecSan).
- Transmission Regiment – Electronic Warfare Company (CompGE);
  - Support Platoon (PelAp);
  - Electronic Warfare Platoon (Medium) (PelGE) (Med);
  - Electronic Warfare Platoon (Light) (Pel GE) (Lig).
- Army Geospatial Information Center – Army Geospatial Support Unit (UnApGeo).
  - Geospatial Analysis Element (ElAnGelo);
  - Data Acquisition Element (ElAqDados);
  - Technical Control Element (ElContrTecn).
- 5th Artillery Regiment– Surveillance Systems Company (CSV);

== Equipment ==
Vehicles
Name	Origin	Type	Number	Image	Notes
Panhard M11	France	Scout car	38		The Portuguese Army currently fields 38 Arquus Ultrav M11D/VBL 4x4 protected scout vehicles. The type which is locally known as the Ultrav M11D, is essentially fielded by the Rapid Reaction Brigade. The fleet includes MILAN F2, PL127/40, AN/PPS-5B and M1919A4 configurations.
Pandur II	AustriaPortugal	Radio access point station vehicle	6		Made under license in Portugal by Fabrequipa and operated by the Transmission Regiment.
MAN TGS 18.440 BB CH	Germany	Armored Communications Vehicle	47		47 trucks equipped with military communications shelter's were acquired in 2023 of witch, 15 have an armored cabin.
Unmanned aerial vehicle
AeroVironment RQ-11 Raven	United States	Unmanned surveillance and reconnaissance aerial vehicle	36		36 aircraft or twelve systems (together with associated services and equipment) were purchased through the NSPA on 20 August 2018.
Field artillery
M114A1	United States	Towed artillery	12		40 units received in 1983. 12 operated by Intervention Brigade Field Artillery Battalion.
Field artillery
AN/TPQ-36	United States	Counter-battery radar	2		Acquired in 2003 together with HMMWV M1097A2 vehicles for towing.

- MARWIN MW12 weather station;
- Shelters with workstations for intelligence analysis and command post for information assessment.
