= Véhicule Blindé Léger =

French wheeled all-terrain vehicle

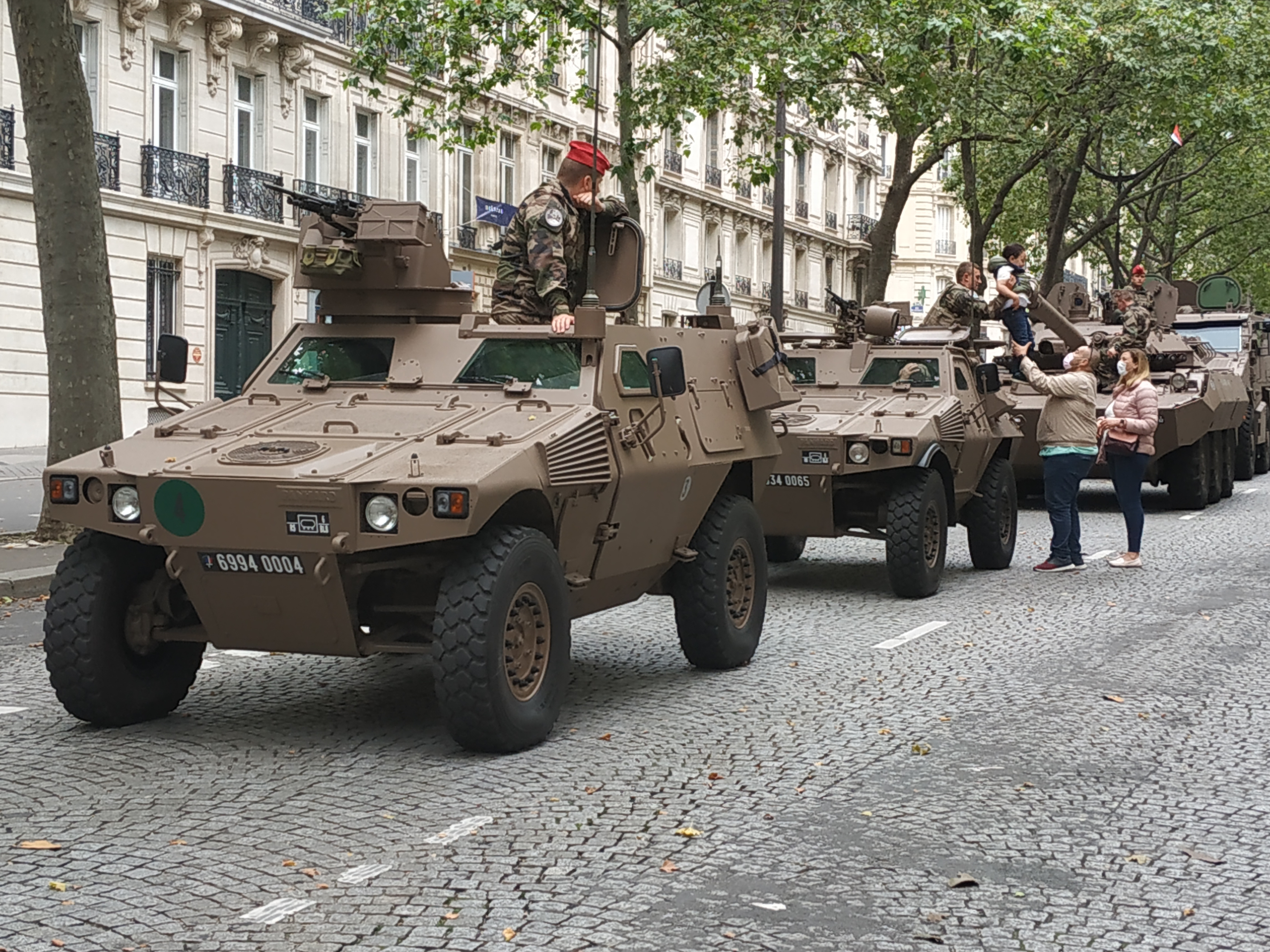
- Véhicule Blindé Léger
- Type: Scout car
- Place of origin: France

Service history
- Wars: Bosnian War; Rwandan Civil War; Djiboutian Civil War; Chiapas conflict; Kosovo War; First Congo War; Second Congo War; War in Afghanistan; First Ivorian Civil War; Second Ivorian Civil War; Boko Haram insurgency; Northern Mali conflict; Central African Republic Civil War

Production history
- Manufacturer: Panhard
- Produced: 1985–2010

Specifications
- Mass: 3.5 to 4 tonnes
- Length: 3.80 m (4.00 m long version)
- Width: 2.02 m
- Height: 1.70 m
- Crew: 3
- Armour: STANAG level 1 (protection against 7.62×51 NATO rounds and shrapnel)
- Main armament: depends on the version
- Secondary armament: none
- Engine: Peugeot XD3T turbo-diesel; From July 2018: DW10FC; 70 kW (94 hp); 97 kW (130 hp) with DW10FC
- Power/weight: 22.0 kW/t (29.5 hp/t)
- Suspension: 0.35 m ground clearance
- Operational range: 600 to 800 km
- Maximum speed: 95 km/h

The Panhard Véhicule Blindé Léger ("Light armoured vehicle"), also known by its initialism Panhard VBL or simply VBL, is a French wheeled 4×4 all-terrain vehicle built by Panhard. The vehicle is offered in various configurations, and was designed to combine the agility of the Peugeot P4 liaison vehicle with adequate protection against small arms fire, artillery fragments, mines and NBC weapons. Produced between 1985 and 2010, the vehicle has been used by the French Army and other European, African and Central American armies in various conflicts since the 1980s.

== Design ==
The French VBL programme started in 1978. The French Army was looking for a light reconnaissance vehicle, intended to work with the AMX-10 RC "wheeled tank", the Hotchkiss M201 jeep being obsolete when compared with the Soviet BRDM-2 armoured car. The new vehicle needed to be armed with a single machine gun for reconnaissance (recce) or with the MILAN missile for anti-tank combat, while being protected from NBC hazards and small arms fire. Both Renault and Panhard proposed a prototype, the trials beginning in 1982. Before its selection by the French armed forces in 1985, the Panhard model was ordered by the Mexican Army in 1984. In 1985, a preproduction of 15 vehicles for the French Army was launched while the VBL started its active operational service in the French Army in 1990. The French Army ordered 569 VBLs in 1990, 330 between 1994 and 1997, and 700 VB2L (lengthened variant) before 2004. The VBL, sold abroad as the ULTRAV M-11 has been produced at Marolles-en-Hurepoix, 30 km (19 mi) south of Paris. Around ten vehicles were produced each month in 2004. The 1,500th VBL was produced in 2001 and the last VBL of the 2,600 VBLs left the plant in 2010.

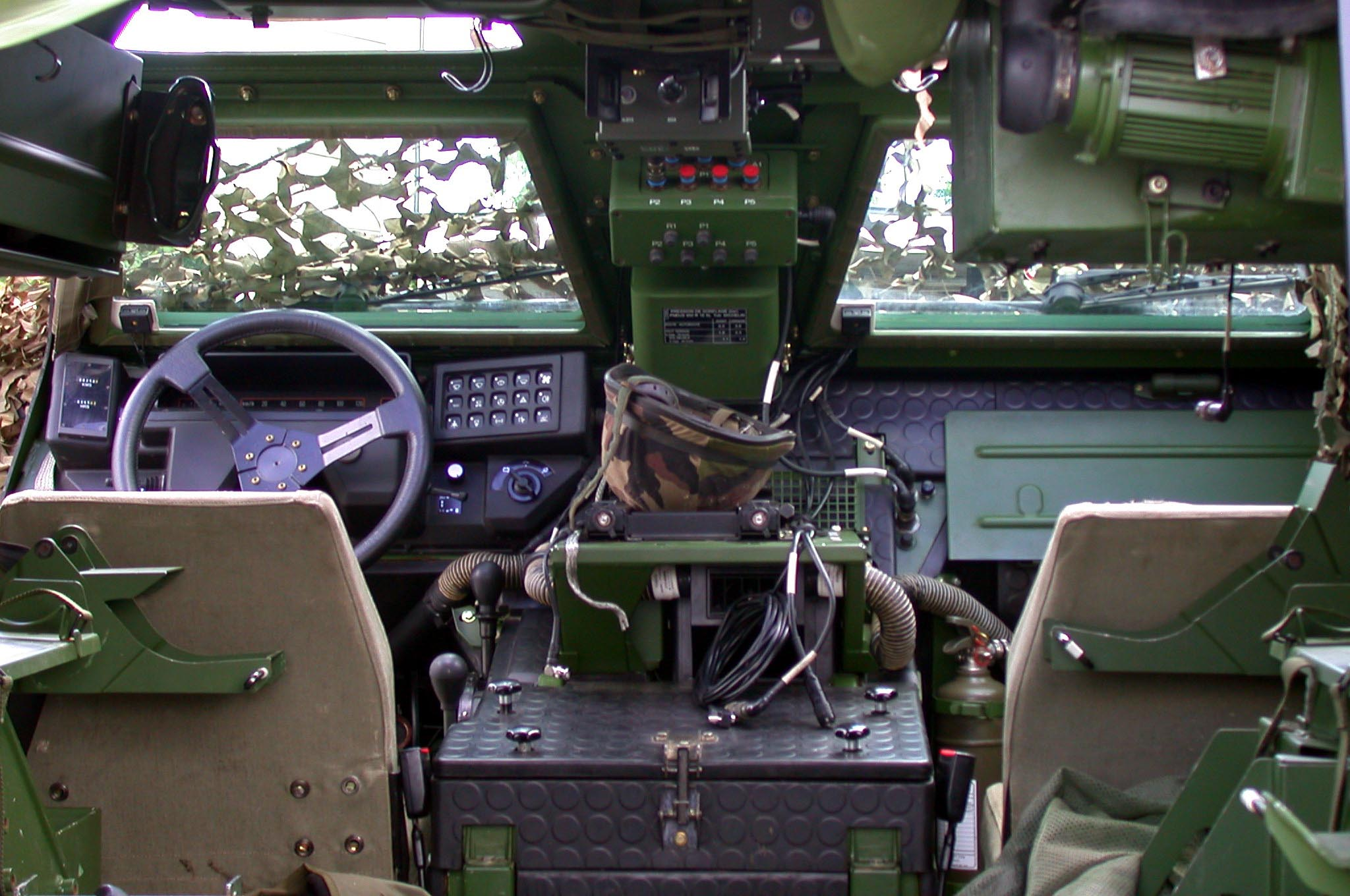
Internal view of a VBL

The VBL has two compartments: a motor bay, placed forward to protect the second compartment, which is for the crew. Its compact internal dimensions led to the design of a lengthened version of the VBL. The crew of the VBL is protected against NBC weapons. The recce versions have two crew members while the anti-tank versions have a crew of three.

The French Army version of the VBL is equipped with a Peugeot XD3T turbo-diesel engine. This engine is used on many civilian cars, such as the Peugeot 505, Peugeot 605 and Talbot Tagora. The VBL used many other standard civilian components, too. Its 71 kilowatts (95 hp) power and 22.0 kW/t (29.5 hp/t) power ratio enable the VBL to drive at 95 km/h (59 mph). It has a fuel consumption of 16 L/100 km (18 mpg_{‑imp}; 15 mpg_{‑US}). Its range of 600 km (370 mi) can be extended to 800 km (500 mi) by two external fuel tanks. Designed to be lighter than 3.5 t (3.9 short tons), the mass of the VBL has increased to 4 t (4.4 short tons) due to the addition of more weapons, armour and systems. The VBL is fully amphibious with a speed of 5.4 km/h (3.4 mph) in water; it is also air transportable by C-130, C-160, Il-76 and A400M. It can be transported underslung by larger helicopters, such as the AS332 Super Puma, and may also be para-dropped.

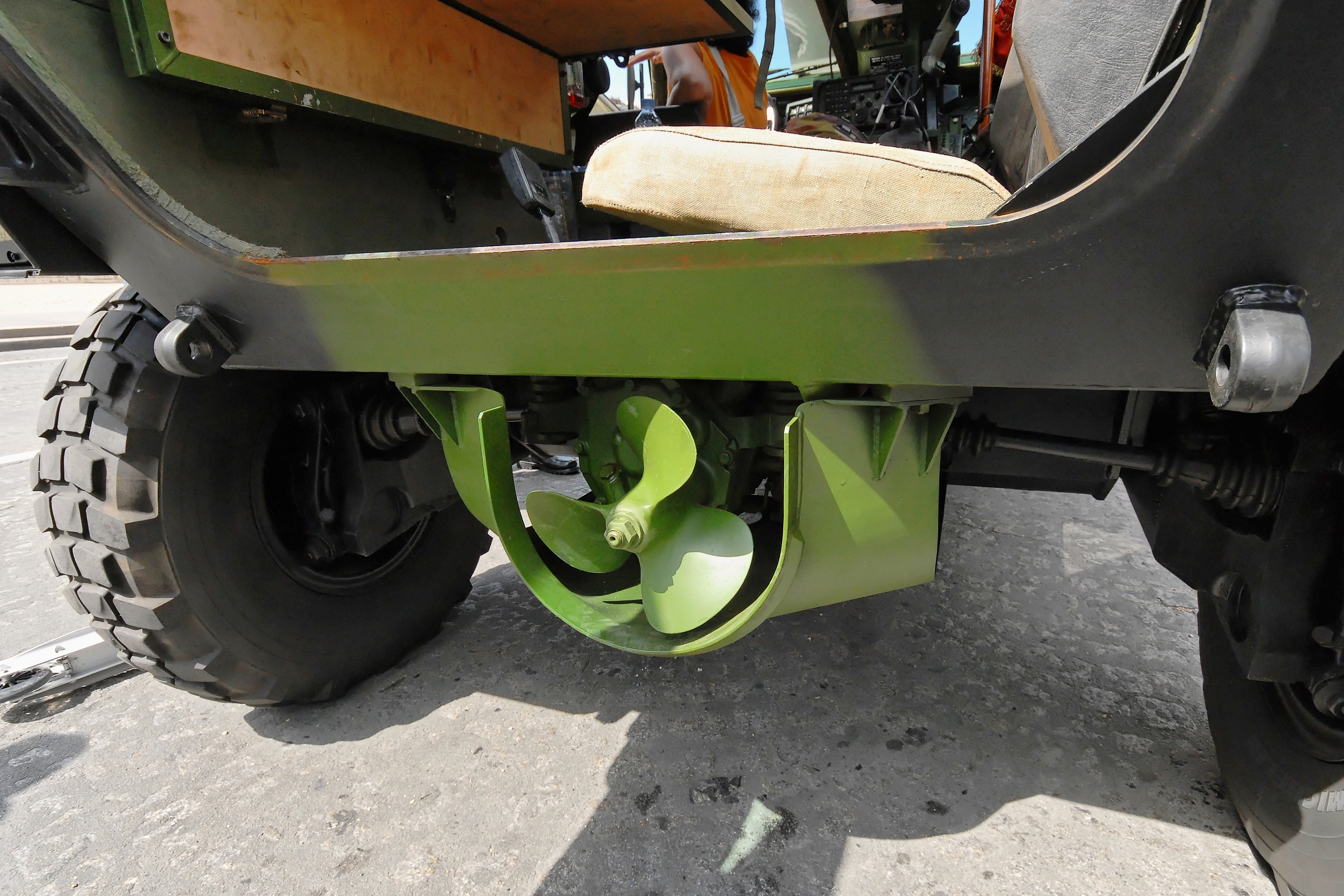
The propeller of the VBL enables it to drive in water.

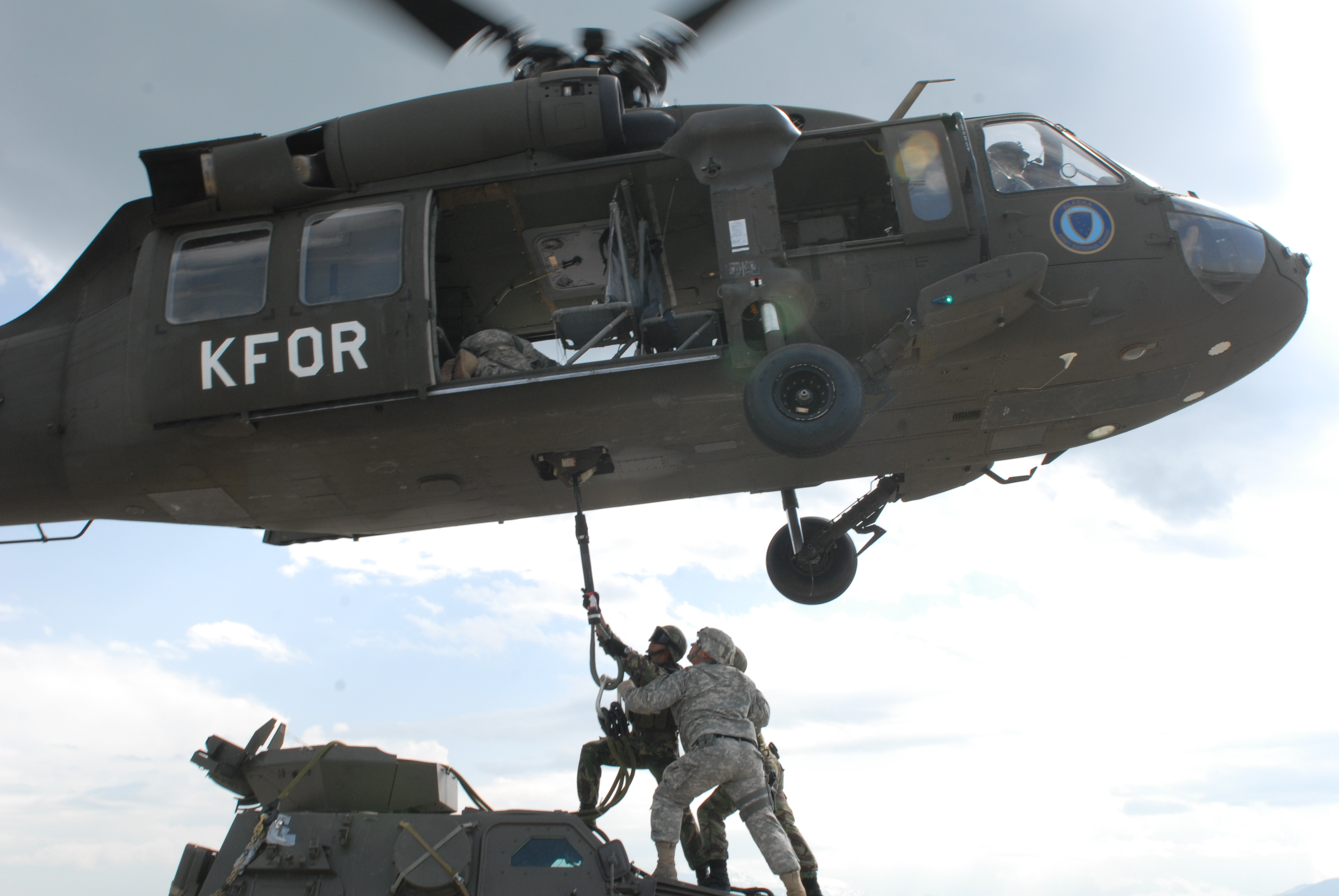
The VBL can be hooked to helicopters. Here a Portuguese VBL and an American UH-60 Blackhawk.

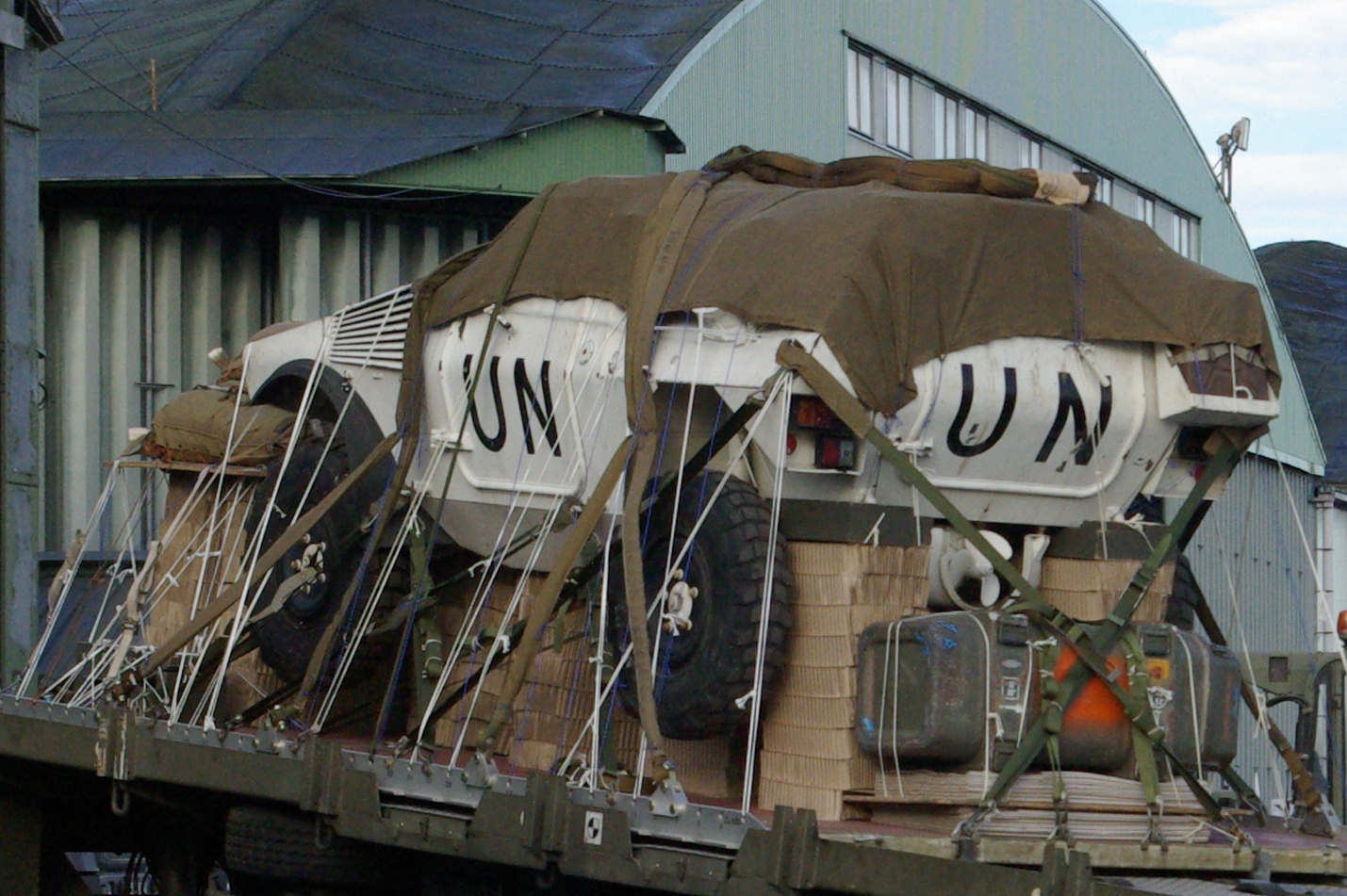
A French VBL packed on a pallet in order to be para-dropped.

== Variants ==
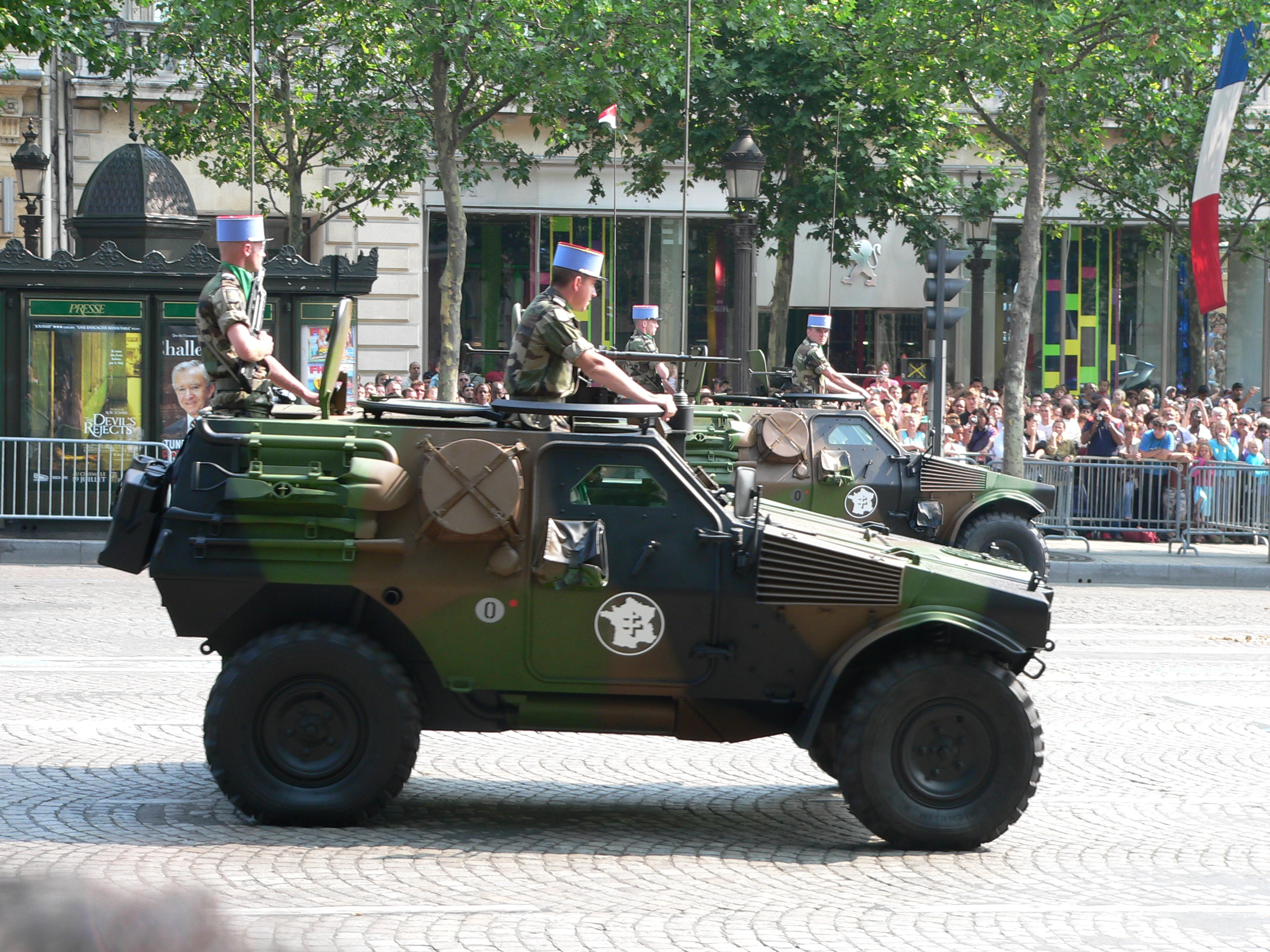
VB2L

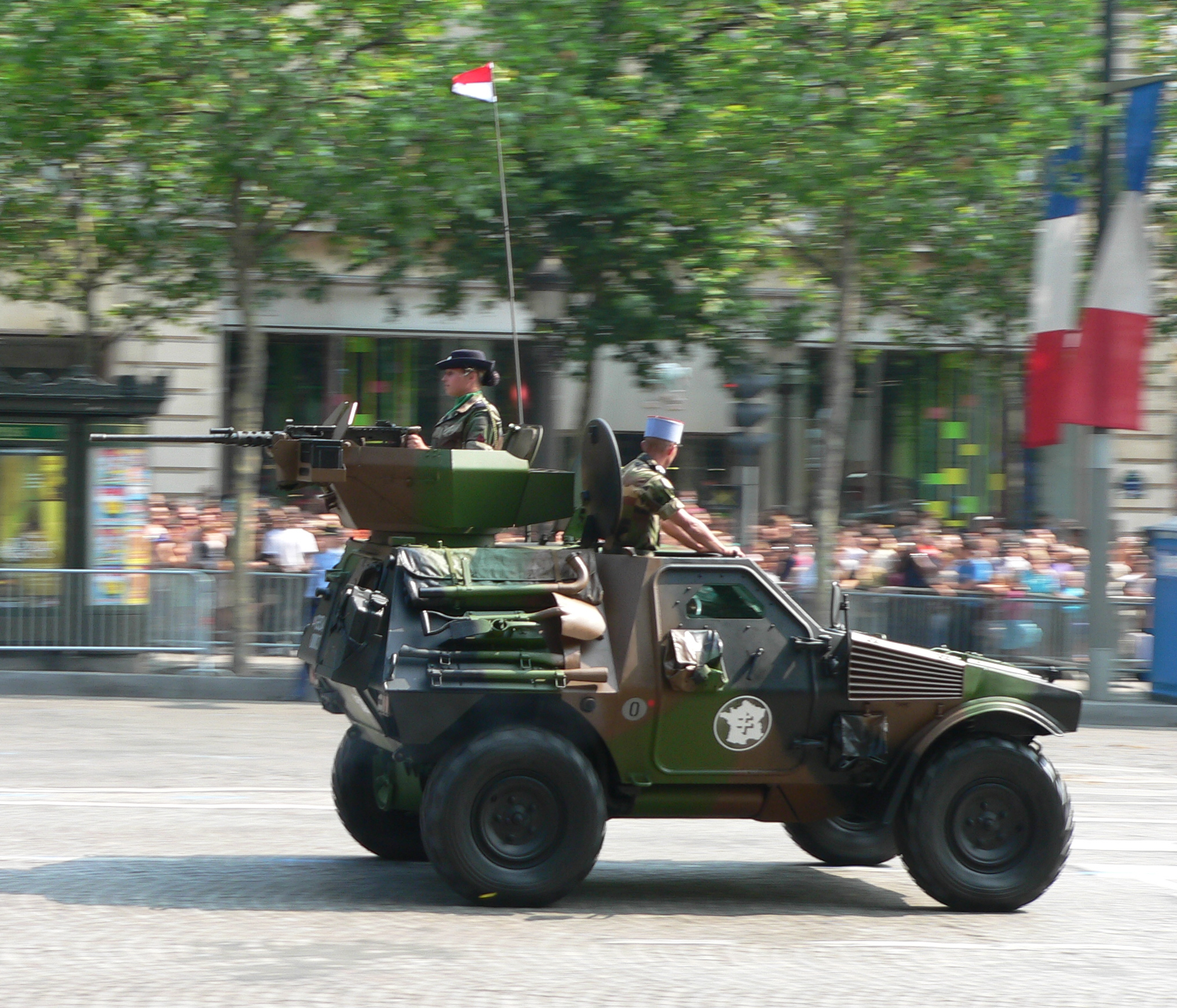
VBL RECO 12.7 with a PL-127 ring-mount

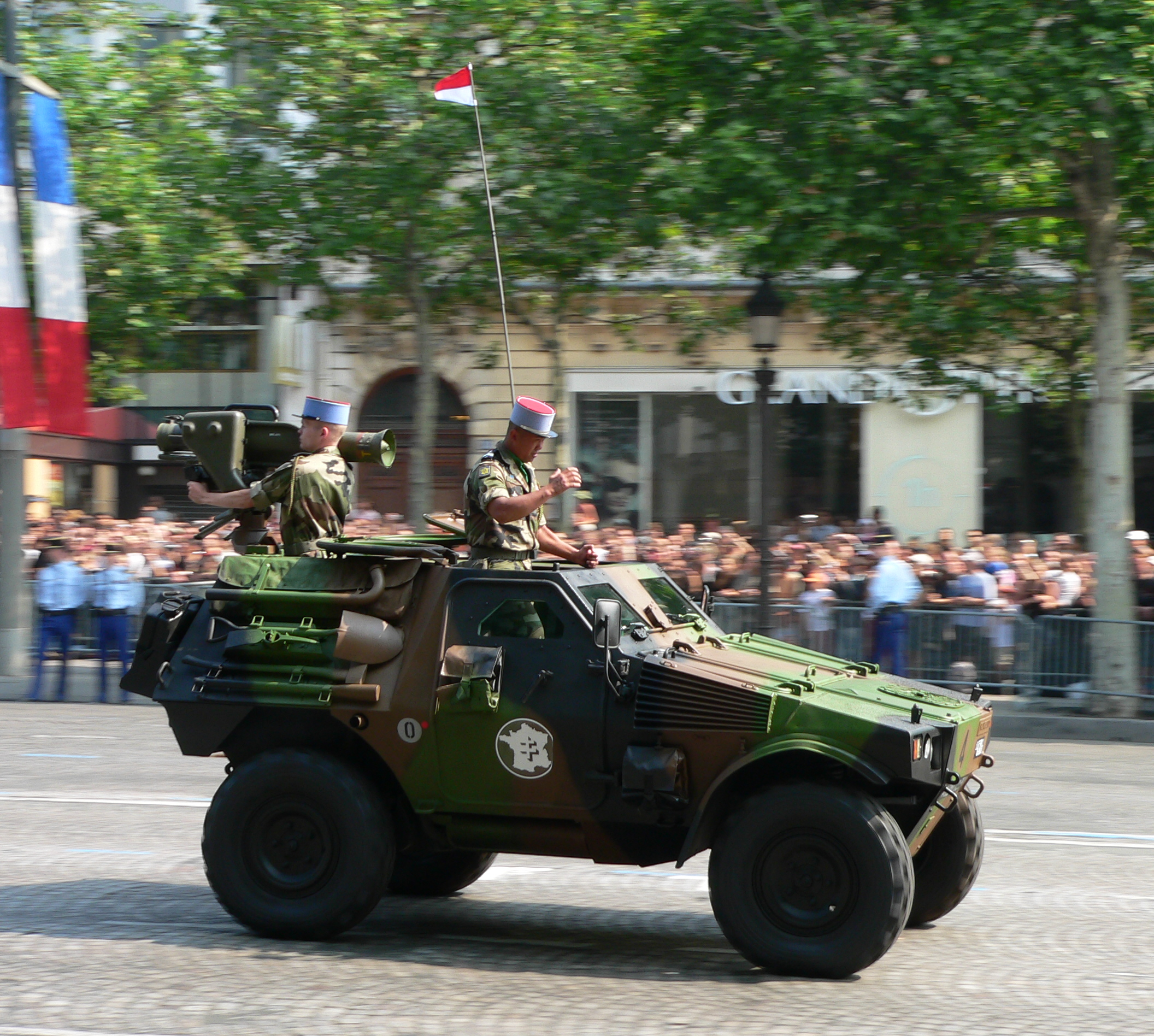
VBL MILAN

=== French versions ===
- VBL standard, armed with a 7.62 mm machine gun AN-F1 (3,000 rounds). It used to carry twelve APILAS anti-tank weapons, but that has been replaced by Eryx short range ATGM
- VBL MILAN: Anti-tank medium range combat. It uses one MILAN missile fire unit with six missiles, and mounts a MIRA Thermal camera.
- VB2L POSTE DE COMMANDEMENT: ("VBL Long") Command version. Lengthened version that operates a VHF system with two PR4G radios, a HF System with one SSB radio for long range and a Radio/intercom system for the crew. Its armament is a ring-mount fitted with a 7.62 mm machine gun (1400 rounds). Specific equipment: A work station with map board and folding table, additional batteries to meet the requirements of the radio and auxiliary services giving up to 8 hours additional endurance, and a folding seat for 4th crew member.
- VBL RECO 12.7: reconnaissance and troops engagement. Operates one M2 machine gun on PL-127 ring-mount protected by side armour. Older versions had a CTM-105 ring-mount. The M2 machine gun can be replaced by a 40 mm grenade launcher.
- VBL Ultima: upgraded version, with a 130 hp (97 kW) diesel engine, new communication devices and without amphibious abilities.

The Reco version (7.62 or 12.7) is equipped with TR-VP 213 or PR4G radio, OB 41 and OB 43 night vision goggles and DUK-DUR 440 radiation meter and a dosimeter. In the MILAN version, the TR-VP 213 is replaced by a TR-VP 13 radio and the OB 41 by OB 51 night goggles.

=== Export versions ===
- VBL TOW: Anti-tank long range with a TOW tube and four missiles.
- VBL ALBI-MISTRAL: Air defense version armed with twin-round ALBI turret firing the MISTRAL "fire-and-forget" air defence missile, six missiles including two on the fire unit.
- VBL Mark 2: Upgraded version with a 125 hp (93 kW) Steyr engine and a Protector Remote Weapon Station.

=== Prototype versions ===
- VBL MVO: version for riot control and internal security tasks.
- VBL (à flancs redressés) CANON: With a MK 20 Rh 202 automatic 20 mm cannon on an automated turret.
- VBL TOURELLE FERMEE: With a 12.7 mm remotely controlled turret.
- VBL Azur: Urban warfare version.

== Service history ==
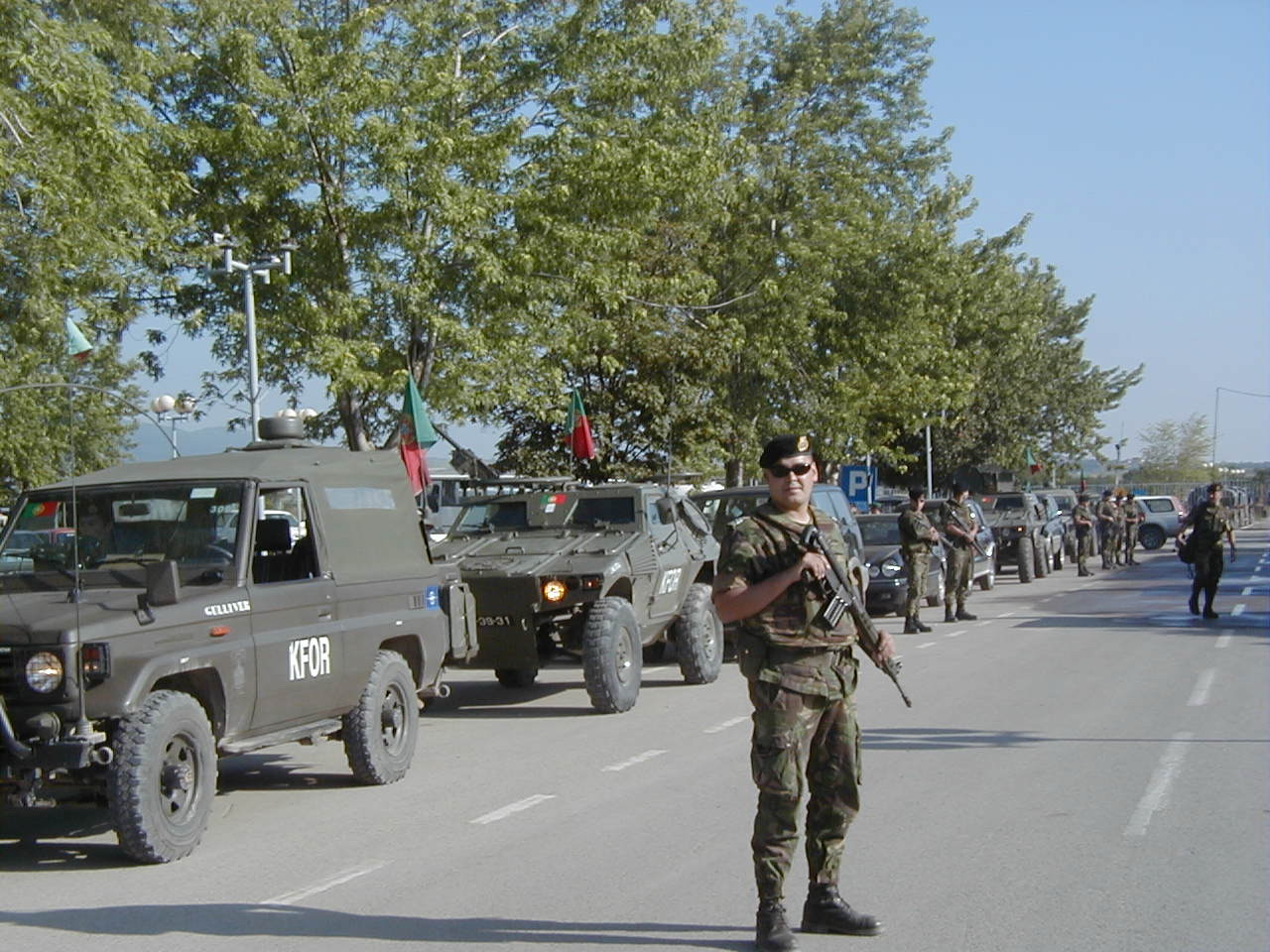
A Portuguese VBL deployed in Kosovo, 2000.

The VBL has been used in many peacekeeping operations of the French Army, notably in Lebanon, Bosnia, Rwanda and Kosovo. On 13 March 1985, the French contingent of the United Nations Interim Force in Lebanon in Beirut received three VBLs: one used on a static post, another as a liaison vehicle and the last one kept in reserve. The VBL was also often seen in the Siege of Sarajevo, due to the contribution of the French Army to the Blue Helmets in Yugoslavia. It was used as a means of transport by the main commanders of the UN forces, including General Lewis MacKenzie, earning the nickname "Sarajevo Taxi". Some were captured by the Army of Republika Srpska after the NATO bombings against Bosnian Serb Force. In other missions, a troop of three VBLs of the régiment d'infanterie-chars de marine in Rwanda was tasked to make contact with the Rwandan Patriotic Front and the civilian population during the Opération Turquoise, and in Kosovo, the operational requirements of the liaison mission led to the development of the Petit Véhicule Protégé program to supplement the VBL.

In the 2000s and 2010s, the VBL has also been used by French forces in Ivory Coast. Between 2002 and 2003, the VBLs and the ERC-90s armored cars opened fire on MPIGO rebels to block their incursions. They were later used in Abidjan during the operation to oust Laurent Gbagbo from power in April 2011. In Afghanistan, the VBL units protected Kabul Airport and logistics axes. In Mali, the VBLs were deployed in 2013 in the Operation Serval; in the subsequent Operation Barkhane, several soldiers crewing VBLs were killed by improvised explosive devices. The VBL was also used in the Central African Republic in 2013.

The other European VBL users also used their vehicles in peacekeeping missions. Portuguese VBLs have been deployed as part of the Kosovo Force (KFOR) in Kosovo, working alongside the old Bravia Chaimite for escorts, control missions or mobile checkpoints. In this operation, the Greek military police company, tasked with traffic regulation on the Pristina-Skopje road, was equipped with VBLs. The Greek Battalion of the KFOR fielded six VBLs for reconnaissance missions. The Greek VBLs were also used in North Macedonia in 2001 during Operation Essential Harvest, and in Afghanistan.

Besides the French, other VBLs were also deployed in Africa. In Rwanda, the Forces Armées Rwandaises used their VBLs against the Rwandan Patriotic Front during the Rwandan Civil War, with the country's reconnaissance squadron (Escadron de Reconnaissance) having been trained by French advisors to use MILAN ATGMs as well as VBLs. Vehicles captured by the Rwandan Patriotic Army later saw action in the First and Second Congo Wars. In Nigeria, the Nigerian Army used the Panhard VBL as part of the Economic Community of West African States Monitoring Group during the Sierra Leone Civil War. They have seen further use during the Boko Haram insurgency, some being lost to Boko Haram. In the Horn of Africa, the Djiboutian VBLs served against the FRUD during the Djiboutian Civil War in the 1990s: in contrast to the better motorised Humvees, the armour of the VBLs enabled them to resist the rebels' ambushes.

Across the Atlantic, the Mexican VBLs faced the Zapatista Army of National Liberation during the Chiapas conflict.

== Operators ==
=== North America ===
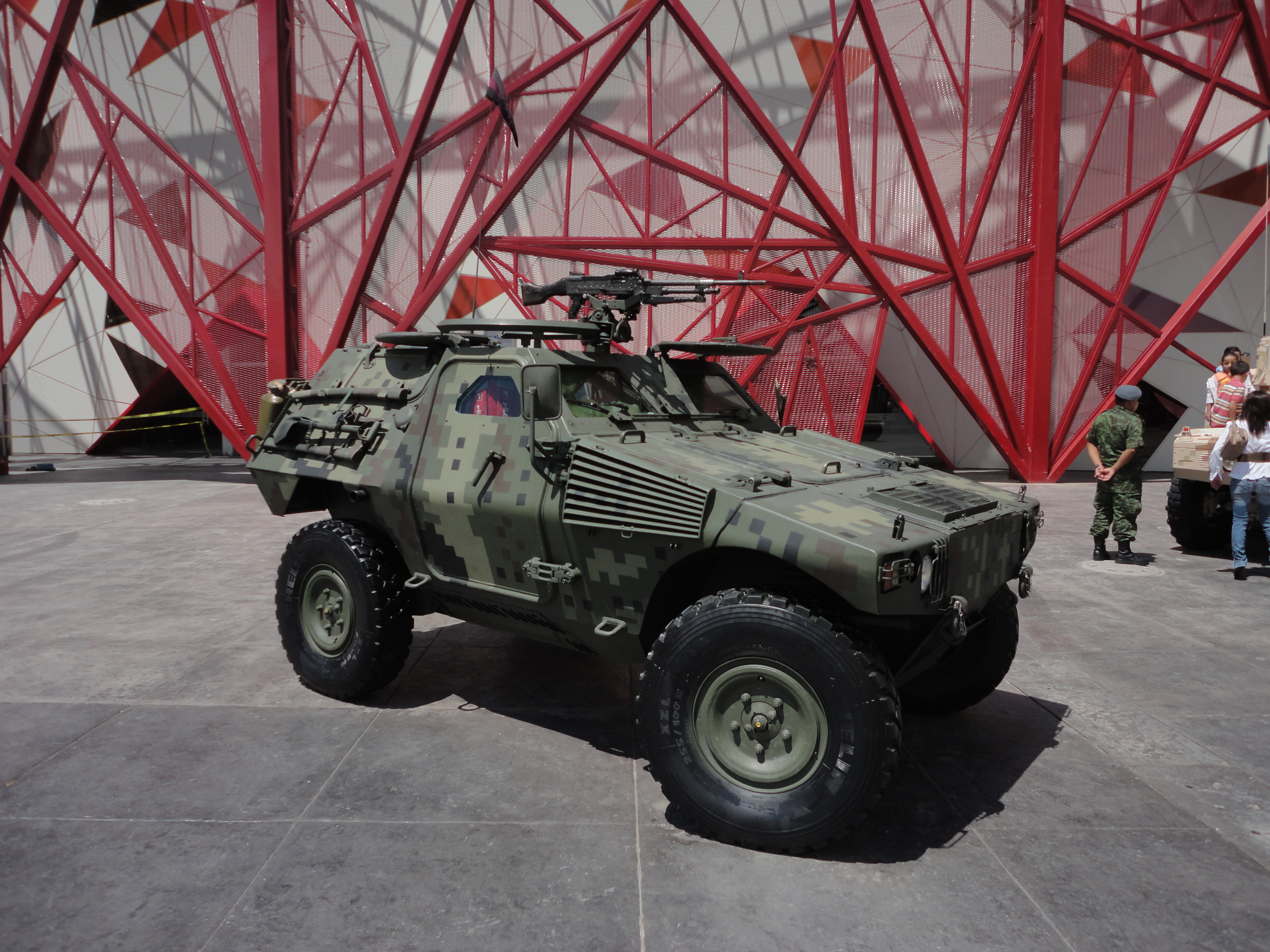
A FN MAG-armed VBL of the Mexican Army in 2010.

The first user of the VBL was the Mexican Army, which ordered 40 in 1984. They were also the first ones to be delivered, in 1985. Three versions were bought: standard armed with a FN MAG, VBL PC (command post, on short chassis) and VBL MILAN.

=== Europe ===
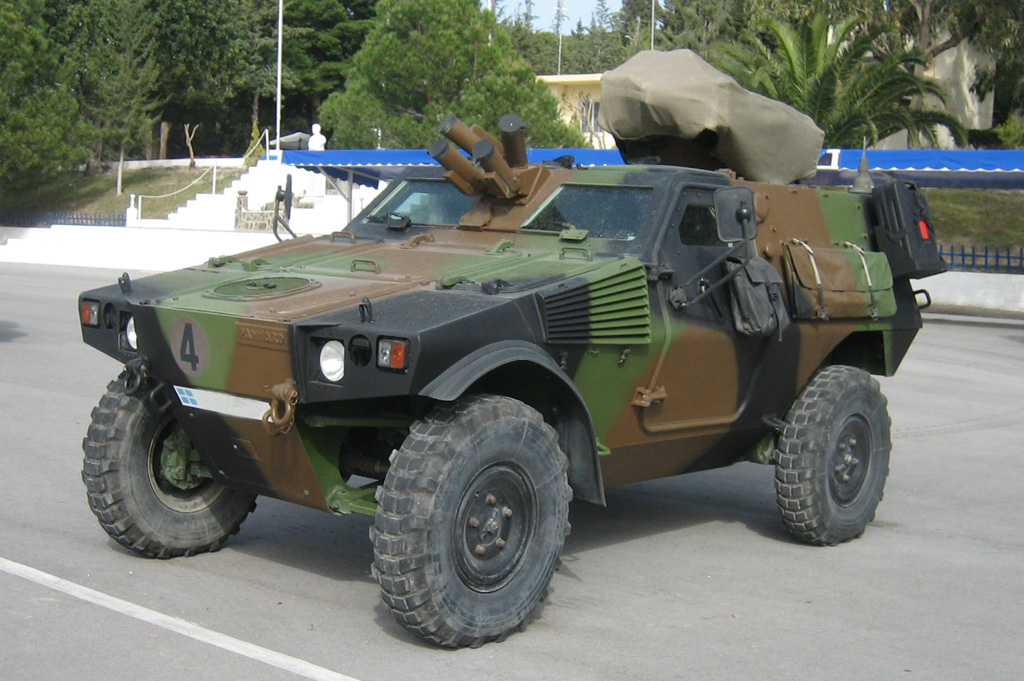
A Hellenic Army VBL in 2007.

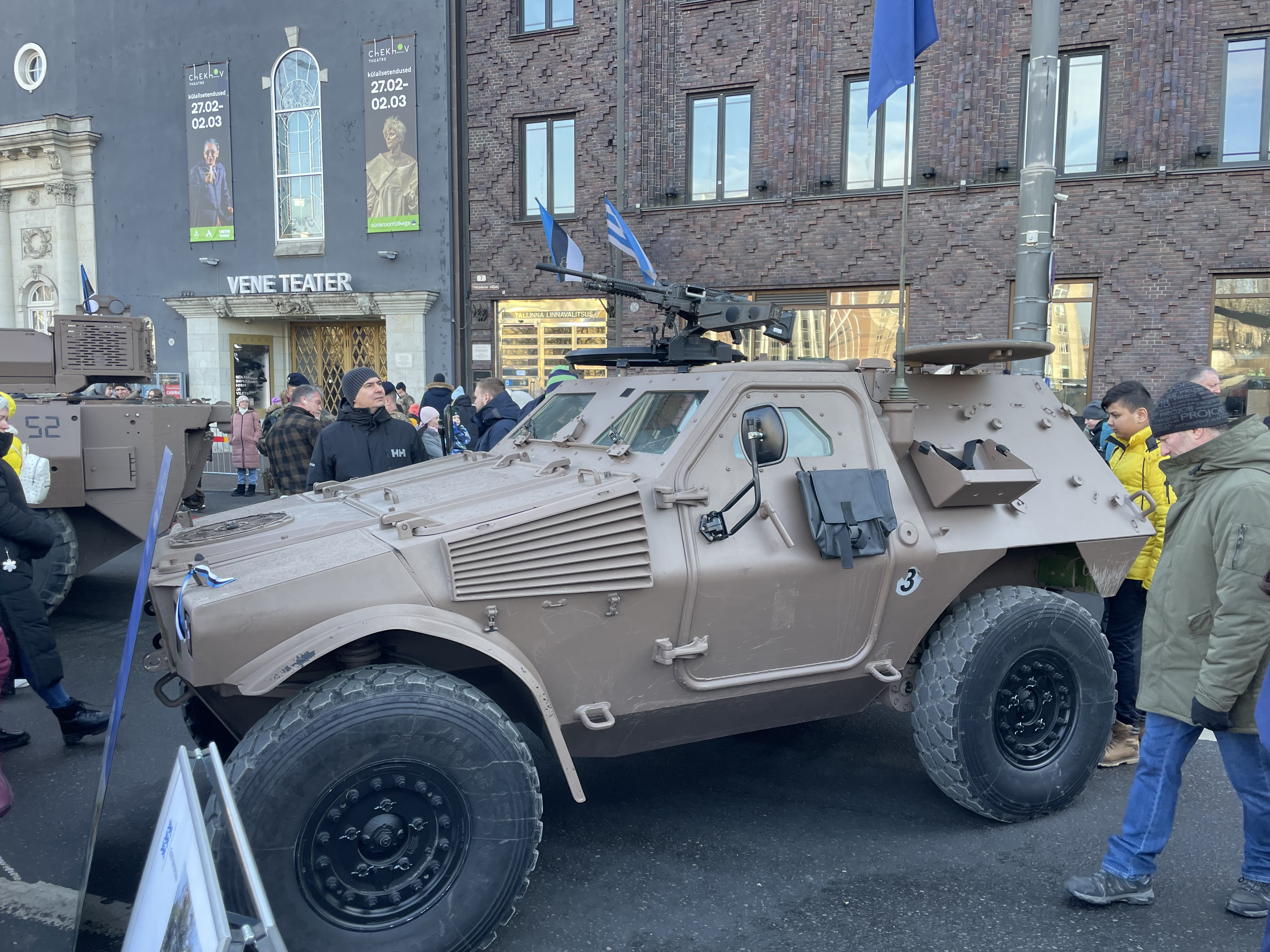
A VBL belonging to French forces in Estonia, exhibited after the military parade on the 2025 Estonian Independence Day in Tallinn

Portugal ordered its first VBL in December 1987. Locally designated M-11 for the short version and M-11D 4x4 M/89-91 for the long version, they have been serving in the Recce squadrons of the Intervention and of the Rapid Reaction brigades. The M-11s are armed with a Browning M1919 machine gun or with a MILAN missile and the M-11Ds with M2 Browning machine gun or SB-40 grenade-launcher on a PL127 ring-mount or with a AN/PPS-5 radar. Greece ordered six VBLs in 1997 to use them in Albania, where the Hummer was too large and too unstable in frozen roads. The success of the vehicles drove to ten more orders between 1997 and 2004. The Greek VBLs are similar to the ones of the French Army, with short and long chassis, some with PL-127 ring-mount or with MILAN missiles. Having received 1,621 VBLs, the French Army has 1,446 VBLs in service in 2019.

=== Africa ===
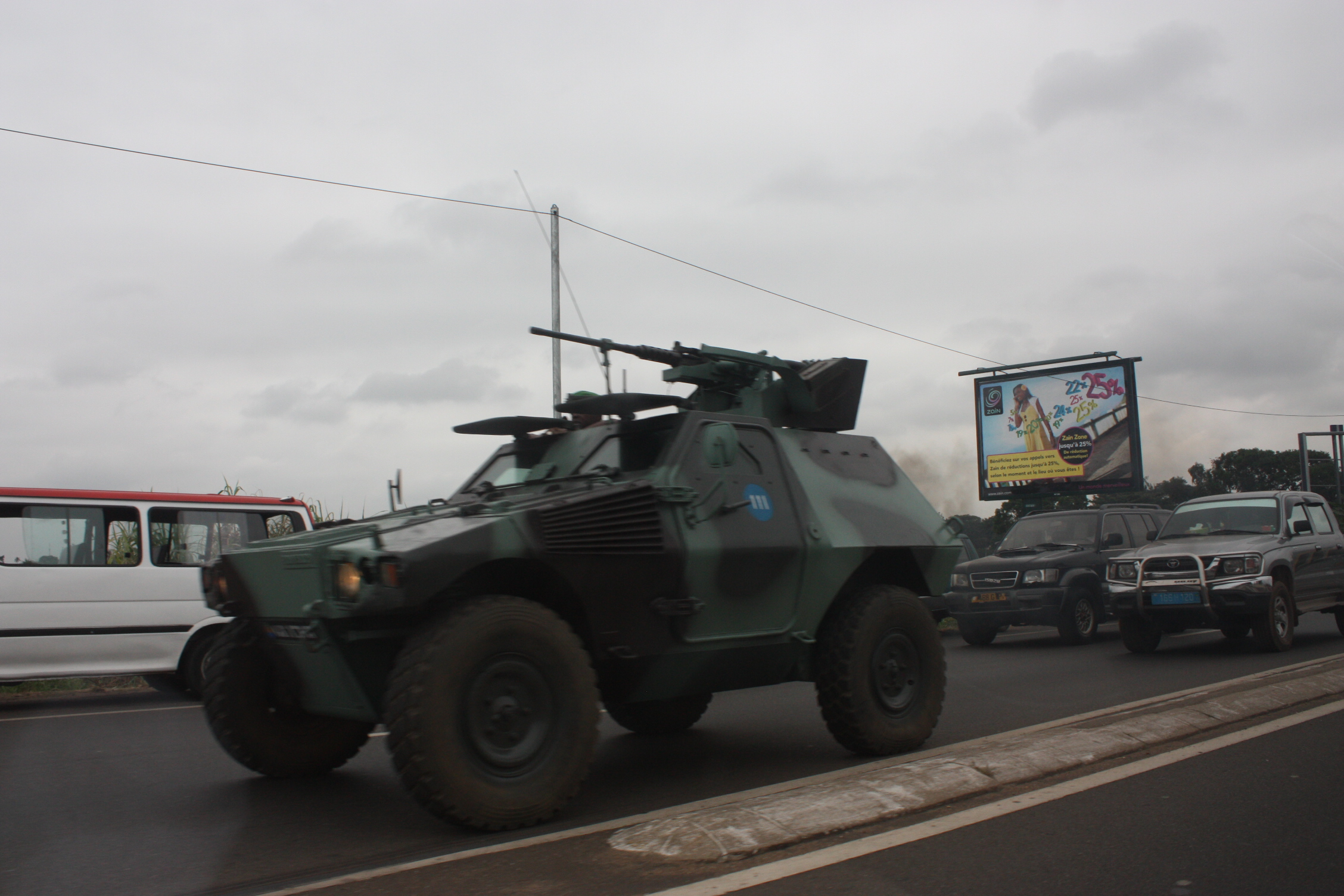
A Gabonese VBL with a CTM-105 ring-mount, in 2009.

Niger ordered one VB2L and six short VBLs with 7.62 machine guns in 1985, all delivered in 1986. Gabon ordered in 1985 twelve VBLs for its presidential guard, one with an Elta radar, the others with a 12.7 machine gun on a CTM-105 mount or with an AA-52. Togo ordered and received in 1986 two standard VBLs. Rwanda ordered sixteen VBLs, including VBL PC, VBL standard and six VBL MILAN in 1986. Cameroon ordered in 1987 one VB2L PC and four short chassis others with a 12.7 machine gun on a CTM 105 ring-mount or with a 7.62 machine gun. The 1st squadron of the Guluf Battalion of the Djiboutian Army has been equipped with seven VBLs since 1987. Some of these VBLs are equipped with a NSV machine gun. A first order of 40 VBLs signed in 1985 by Nigeria was canceled but 72 were ordered in 1992 and delivered, including ten with CTM-105 ring-mount, ten VB2L PC and others with FN MAG machine guns. Around 30 were in operational service in 2004.

=== Arabian peninsula ===
The Kuwait National Guard received twelve VBL TOW and eight VBL with PL 127 in 1996. All these vehicles are armed with a secondary FN MAG machine gun. Qatar ordered sixteen VBLs, in three versions (standard with FN MAG, CTM-105 and MILAN) to equip a recce squadron. After intensive tests in 1994, the sultanate of Oman ordered more than 132 VBLs for its anti-tank and recce squadrons. Several versions have been ordered, such as the standard FN MAG version, the VBL TOW, the VBL CTM-105 and a version with Mistral SAMs. The Kuwait Ministry of Interior ordered twenty VBL Mk 2 for its special forces in 2008.

=== Asia ===
Indonesia ordered eighteen VBLs, armed with the FN MAG, in 1996. However, economic difficulties and the Timor Leste crisis prevented them from buying more.

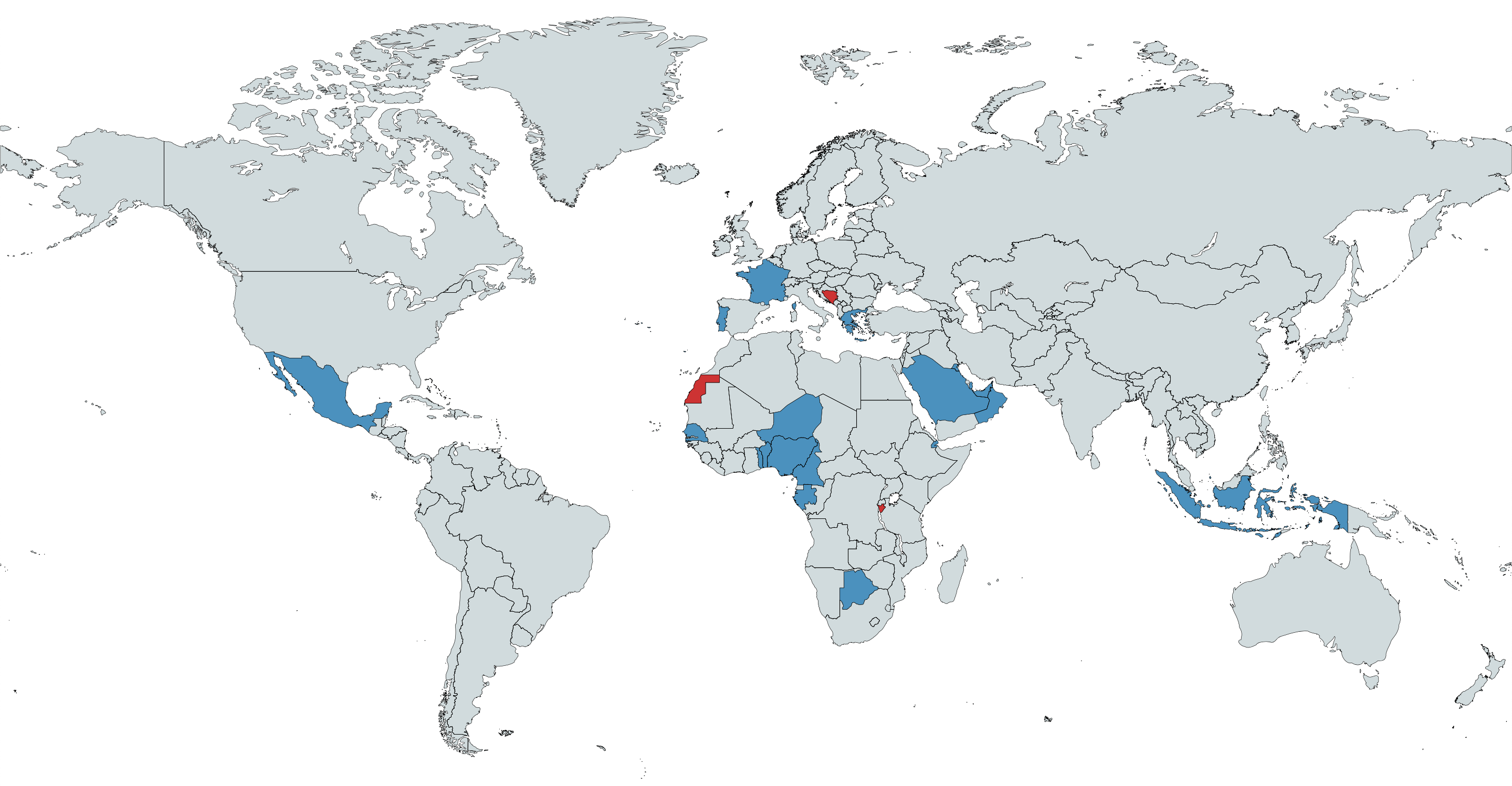
Map with operators of the VBL in blue and former operators in red

=== Current Operators ===
- Benin: 10 purchased from France in 1986. All operational as of 2024.
- Botswana: 64 VBL in service as of 2024. 37 received from France between 2002-03.
- Cameroon: 5 received from France in 1986 and still in service.
- Djibouti: 15 in service as of 2024. SIPRI confirms 10–15 received from France in 1987.
- France: 1,380
- Gabon: 14 purchased from France in 1985 and still in service.
- Greece: 242 received from France between 1997-2002. All currently in service.
- Indonesia: 18 received from France in 1997.
- Kuwait: 40 purchased from France in 1997, 2009.
- Mexico: 40 purchased from France in 1984; 8 equipped with Milan ATGMs.
- Niger: 7 received from France in 1986 and still in service as of 2024.
- Nigeria: 72 received from France in 1990, 1994. Still in service.
- Oman: 132 received from France between 1997-2004. 124 operational as of 2024.
- Portugal: 37 received from France in 1986, 1999-2001. 16 still in service.
- Qatar: 16 purchased from France in 1992 and still in service.
- Rwanda: 16 received from France in 1998. Still in service.
- Togo: 2 received from France in 1987. Still in service
- United Arab Emirates: 24 received from France in 2004. Still in service.

=== Former operators ===
- Boko Haram
- Republika Srpska: some captured
- Senegal: 9 received from France in 1994.
- Saudi Arabia: 2 received from France in 1997.

=== Failed exports ===
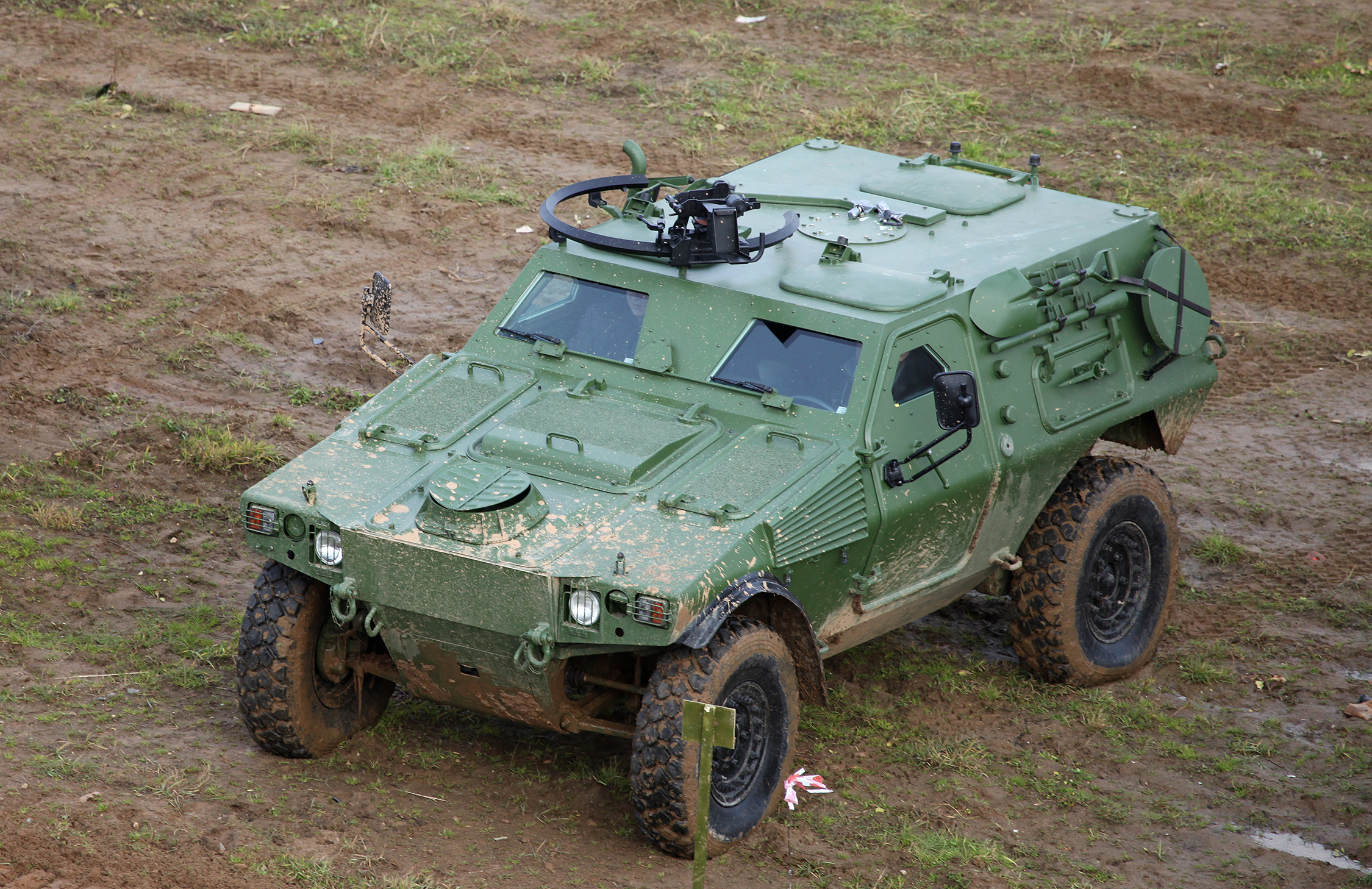
VBL Mark 2 at a Russian arms show in 2013.

- Russia: the Ministry of Internal Affairs considered the building of 500 to 1000 VBL Mark 2 for its security forces in 2011. This prospect was cancelled in 2014 due to the international sanctions during the Russo-Ukrainian War.
- West Germany: the Bundeswehr tested the VBL at the end of the 1980s.

== See also ==
- Panhard AML
- Puma (AFV) of Italy
- Komatsu LAV of Japan
- Otokar Cobra of Turkey

== Bibliography ==
- Debay, Yves (2004). VBL Panhard (in French). Histoire et collections. ISBN 9782913903166.
