= 5th Artillery Regiment (Portugal) =

- Regimento de Artilharia N.º 5
- Active: 1763/1911–present
- Country: Portugal
- Branch: Army
- Type: Field artillery
- Part of: Intervention Brigade
- Garrison/HQ: Vendas Novas
- Mottos: Brave and always Loyal (Bravos e sempre Leais)
- Engagements: Peninsular War; Liberal Wars; World War I Portuguese Colonial War
- Decorations: Gold Medal of Military Valour
- Website: Official Website

Commanders
- Present Commander: António J. Pardal dos Santos
- First Commander (1834): João Baptista Lopes Veloso

Insignia
- Abbreviation: RA5

The 5th Artillery Regiment (Portuguese: Regimento de Artilharia N.º 5, RA5) is a regiment of the Portuguese Army, which provides the Field Artillery Group for the Intervention Brigade. The RA5 is based at Vendas Novas.

== History ==
1763 - The establishment of the Artillery Regiment of Porto, which is extinct in 1829 as 4th Artillery Regiment of Porto.
1835 - By decree of Queen Maria II, the date from which came to be used as a military unit. In 1878 Mountain Artillery Brigade is created, with the same installed at Serra do Pilar in 1889, remaining there until disbanded in 1897. Installed in the Serra do Pilar Detach Batteries of the RA6, and in 1897 RA4 in 1899, both from Penafiel, and 5th Artillery Regiment of Viana do Castelo in 1902.
1911 - Based in the Serra do Pilar RA6 (Mounted), which is considered the unit of origin of the current RA5.
1921 - The designation becomes 6th Artillery Regiment.
1926 - It gets the name 6th Artillery Regiment for the following year, 1927, be called 5th Light Artillery Regiment(RAL5).
1939 - Due to the reorganization of the army is created 2nd Heavy Artillery Regiment (RAP2).
1975 - It took the name of Artillery Regiment of Serra do Pilar (RASP).
1993 - It takes the current designation RA5. Inherits the heritage of the 4th Artillery Regiment of Porto extinct in 1829, the 2nd Mountain Artillery Group and 5th Light Artillery Regiment.

== Equipment ==
Model	Image	Origin	Type	Notes
Infantry Weapons
Glock 17 Gen 5		Austria	Semi-automatic pistol	Service pistol.
FN SCAR L STD		Belgium	Assault rifle	Standard service rifle.
FN Minimi Mk3		Belgium	Light machine gun	Standard light machine gun.
Browning M2		United States	Heavy machine gun	Used on tripods and mounted on vehicles.
Carl Gustav M2		Sweden	Recoilless rifle	Modernised in 2020 by the UAGME.
FN40GL		Belgium	Under barrel grenade launcher	Purchased in 2019, used with the FN SCAR L or individually.
Artillery
L16A2		United Kingdom	Mortar	
M114A1		United States	Towed howitzer	12 operated in service as of 2024. Unknown quantity of howitzers donated to Ukraine in 1st trimester 2025 and 4 donated after December 2025. Replacement of the M114 planned with the CAESAR Mk 2 (letter of intent signed in February 2025). 12 would replace the M114, 2 batteries of 6 self-propelled guns.
Command and Control
Raytheon AFATDS Advanced Field Artillery Tactical Data System	–	United States	Automated command and control system	Automated command-and-control software for coordinating, planning, and executing fire support.
AN/TPQ-36 Firefinder radar		United States	Counter-battery radar	Six vehicles with two radars received in 2003. The tow-vehicle is unarmoured, and used to tow the radars.
Elbit Systems Coral-CR		Israel	Binocular with laser rangefinder	Used by artillery and mortar advanced observation units for ISTAR (Intelligence, surveillance, target acquisition and reconnaissance) missions.
Marwin BW12	–	Finland	Automatic Weather Station	Used to predict the direction, speed, and range of an artillery projectile through air density, air temperature and humidity.
Tactical Vehicles
HMMWV M1025A2		United States	4×4 armoured vehicle	Known in the army as the Auto Blindado Reconhecimento 1.25 ton, and this variant is the mf/00.
HMMWV M1097		United States	4×4 utility vehicle	Used by the 5th Artillery Regiment of the Intervention Brigade in two versions: Cargo variant used to tow AN/TPQ-36 firefinder radars; Command and control vehicle, with an shelter equipped with antennas and comunnications systems.
Mitsubishi L200		Japan	4×4 utility vehicle	Army designation: TG4 Mitsubishi 4x4 L200 MF/08.
Land Rover Defender		United Kingdom	4×4 command vehicle	Army designation: Land Rover Defender 90 TD SW E 4×4 MF/08.
Toyota Land Cruiser HZJ73		Japan Portugal (licence)	4×4 utility vehicle	Assembly in the Portuguese Toyota factory, Salvador Caetano. Army designation: Toyota Land Cruiser D 4×4 MF/01.
Iveco 40.10 WM		Italy Portugal (local modification)	4×4 light tactical truck	Army designation: mA/89-90
Iveco 90.17 WM		Italy	4×4 tactical truck	Army designation: mA/91
RMMV TGS 26.440 BB CH		Germany	4×4 tactical truck	Purchase in 2023 as part of a batch of 61 trucks, 13 of which have a modular armoured cab for general transport.
MAN 10.224		Germany	4×4 tactical truck	Army Designation: Auto TG 4 ton. TP20.
Unimog 1750L		Germany	4×4 tactical truck	Variants with or without winch.
Mercedes-Benz 1017		Germany	4×4 tactical truck	Used to tow M114 155 mm howitzer.
Unmanned Aerial Vehicles
AeroVironment RQ-11 Raven		United States	Fixed-wing mini-UAV Unmanned aerial vehicle	36 aircraft or twelve systems (together with associated services and equipment) were purchased through the NSPA on 20 August 2018.
MyFlyDream Nimbus Tricopter 1800		China	VTOL, fixed-wing mini-UAV Unmanned aerial vehicle	Received in 2021, used by the First Anti-aircraft Artillery Regiment and the 5th Artillery Regiment.

== Awards and decorations ==
Gold Medal of Military Valour

- 1st Mountain Artillery Brigade - Portuguese Mozambique 1895

1st Class Cross of War Medals

- 2nd Battery/5th Group of Artillery Battery/CEP - France 1918
- 3rd Battery/6th Group of Artillery Battery/CEP - France 1918
- 4th Battery/5th Group of Artillery Battery/CEP - France 1918
- 1688th Artillery Company/CTI Guinea - Portuguese Guinea 1964/74

== Sources ==
- http://www.exercito.pt/sites/RA5/Paginas/default.aspx
