= Pandur II (8×8) =

Pandur 8×8 APC
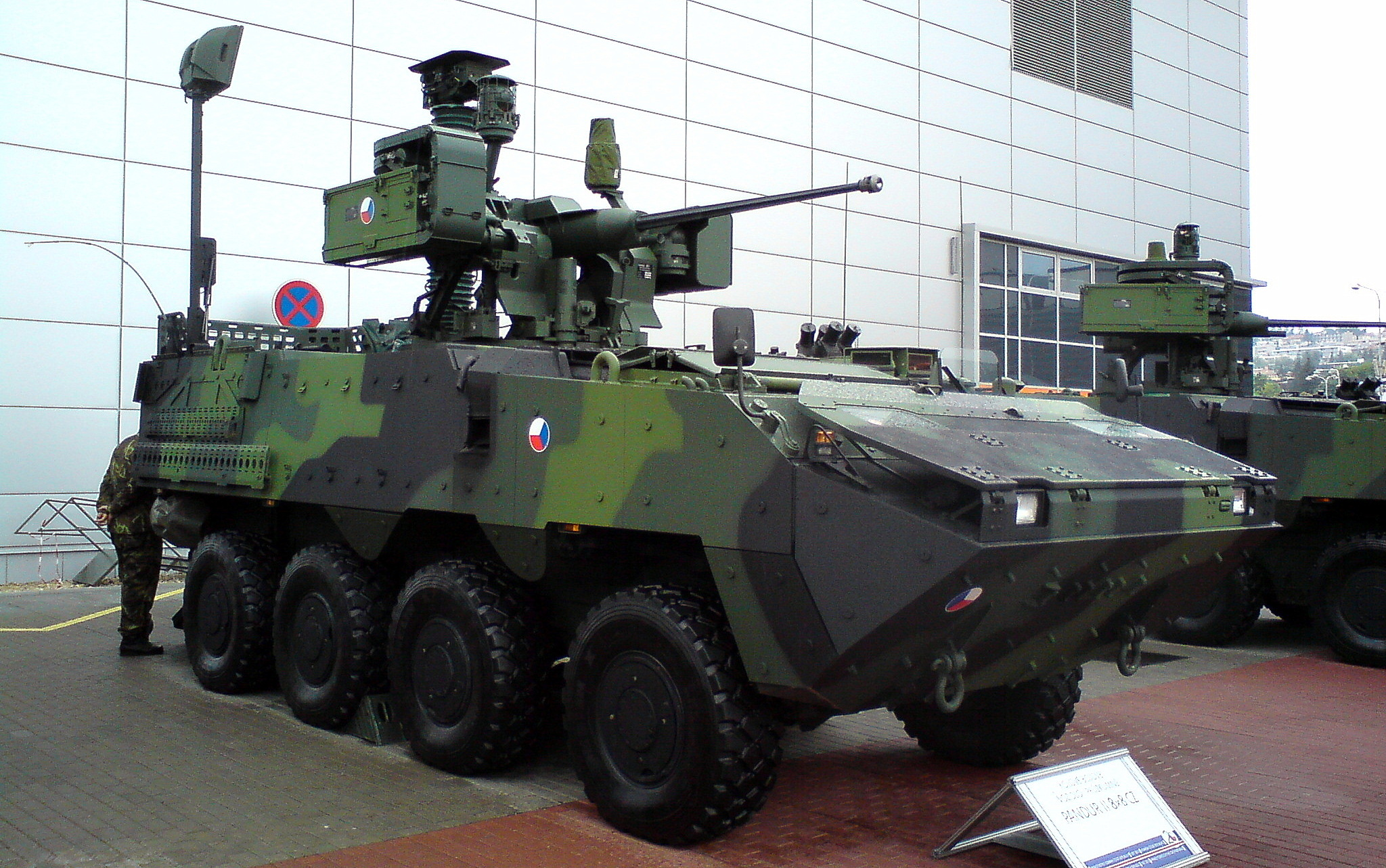
- Pandur II 8×8 of the Czech Army
- Type: Armoured personnel carrier
- Place of origin: Austria

Service history
- In service: 2001–present
- Used by: See Operators
- Wars: See Variants

Production history
- Manufacturer: Steyr-Daimler-Puch and Czechoslovak Group (licensed production for Central and Eastern Europe + Asia)
- Developed from: Pandur I (6×6)
- Produced: 2001–present

Specifications
- Mass: 17.3 t (38,000 lb) (with minimal protection) or 22 t (49,000 lb) (with additional protection) *turret not included 20.1 t (44,000 lb) (amphibious limit)
- Length: 7,350 mm (289 in)
- Width: 2,670 mm (105 in)
- Height: 2,080 mm (82 in)
- Crew: 3 (APC version)
- Passengers: 11 (APC version)
- Main armament: 30 mm Mk44 Bushmaster II gun; or; TOW anti-tank guided missile; or; 105 mm Cockerill high-pressure gun; or; 7.62 mm FN MAG machine gun; or; 0.50 in (12.7 mm) M2 Browning heavy machine gun
- Secondary armament: 7.62 mm FN MAG machine gun; or; 0.50 in (12.7 mm) M2 Browning heavy machine gun; or; Spike LR anti-tank guided missile
- Engine: Cummins ISLe 450 HPCR, 8.9l in-line 6 turbo-diesel engine 335 kW (449 hp); 1,628 N⋅m (1,201 ft⋅lb)
- Payload capacity: 8.5 t (19,000 lb)
- Transmission: ZF 6HP602 S PLUS (6 forward, 1 reverse gears); Steyr VG 1400 transfer case
- Operational range: Approx. 700 km
- Maximum speed: 105 km/h (65 mph) (road); ≤11 km/h (6.8 mph) (water)

The Pandur II is an improved modular all-wheel-drive version of the Pandur 6×6 APC wheeled armoured vehicle. It was developed as a private venture by the Austrian company Steyr-Daimler-Puch Spezialfahrzeuge. Steyr-Daimler-Puch Spezialfahrzeuge is part of General Dynamics European Land Systems (GDELS), which is also the parent company of MOWAG of Switzerland and Santa Bárbara Sistemas of Spain.

== Military aspects ==
The Pandur II has an all-welded steel body with optional armour upgrades. The basic armour package is designed to protect against 7.62 to 14.5 mm (0.300 to 0.571 in) armour-piercing rounds (customers may choose the armour thickness). The vehicle is designed to be transportable in a Lockheed Martin C-130 Hercules transport aircraft. The driver is seated on the left at the front and the engine is to the right. The driver is provided with a single piece hatch cover as well as three-way periscopes, one of which can be replaced by a passive periscope for night missions. The vehicle is designed to take a number of turret systems (such as the SP 30 turret also mounted on the ASCOD AFV of the Spanish and Austrian Armies), or it can be used as a standard APC with a mounted machine gun. The vehicle can carry 6 infantry with the turret and 12 without the turret.

== Technical description ==
The Pandur II is an armoured off-road vehicle (APC) intended for military use. It is available in two versions, a 6×6 and an 8×8 version; both versions are designed to be as offroad capable as possible whilst providing sophisticated protection, including protection against mines, for their occupants. The Pandur II can be used in cold (arctic) and hot (desert) climates, in urban regions, impassable terrain, as well as in waters such as rivers, lakes, and coast waters. In order to reduce the unit cost, many industrial-grade off-the-shelf components (e. g. an industrial diesel engine) were used for the Pandur II. The following description primarily describes the 8×8 variant.

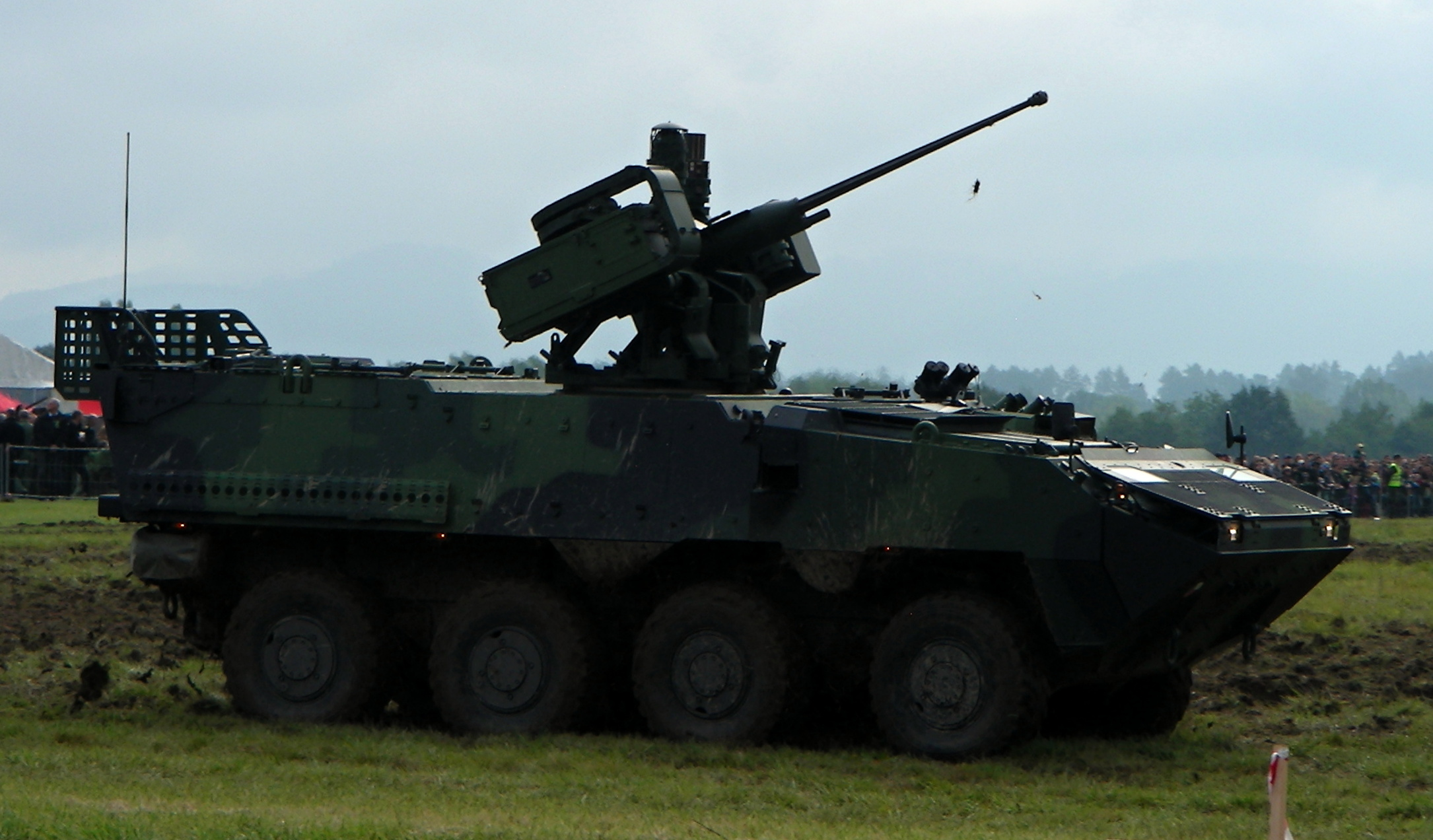
Pandur II at NATO Days 2013 in Ostrava.

=== Running gear ===
The body is made of highest-tenacity steel plates that are welded together. Thus, the body is rigid and does not allow torsion. The wheels are coil-sprung and have hydraulic shock absorbers, the suspension is similar to the MacPherson strut system. Each wheel has two control arms, a lower transverse control arm, and an upper longitudinal control arm. The coil springs are designed to have progressive characteristics, which is achieved with additional rubber springs. The control arms (as well as other suspension parts that do not warm up) are made of a chemically pure steel that does neither contain phosphorus nor sulphur (30CMo6). Therefore, the steel retains its mechanical properties at temperatures as low as -45 °C (228 K) — regular steel typically embrittles at temperatures below -20 °C (253 K).

The Pandur II's first two pairs of wheels are steered, the last two pairs of wheels are not. The front pair of wheels' steering trapezes are mechanically connected and use the Ackermann steering principle; the normals' point of intersection lies in between the rear axles. The steering system itself is a hydraulically assisted dual-circuit power steering system that is located within the Pandur II's protective body. The Pandur II is also fitted with a steering brake system that reduces its turning radius. In order to improve the Pandur II's off-road capabilities, it has a tyre-pressure regulation-system that allows manipulating the tyre pressure for each pair of wheels individually or for all wheels at once. All tyres are also fitted with stiff-rubber running-elements that allow them to maintain their basic tyre characteristics even when they are completely deflated. This includes fixing the tyre on the rim.

=== Engine and gearbox ===
The Pandur II is powered by a Cummins ISLe HPCR industrial diesel engine. This engine is a straight-six, common-rail injected turbodiesel with a variable turbine geometry turbocharger, intercooler, and heavy-duty water cooler; the water cooler is designed for outside air temperatures of up to 52 °C (325 K). The engine displaces 8.9 litres and is rated 335 kW at 2100/min, with a maximum torque of 1621 N·m at 1200...1800/min. For tactical reasons, the engine is not fitted with an exhaust gas treatment system (such as a lean NO_{x} trap or SCR catalyst). Therefore, only the combustion itself combined with exhaust gas recirculation are used for emissions control — the Pandur II complies with the Euro III emissions standard.

The main gearbox is an automatic ZF 6HP602c six-speed gearbox that has a hydrodynamic torque converter, planetary gears, and a hydrodynamic retarder. The gearbox as well as the diesel engine, radiator, generator, hydraulic system, and the compressed air system are all put into a quick-coupling module, the so-called Powerpack. The Powerpack can be uninstalled from the Pandur II within 20 minutes. The engine can run when the Powerpack is not installed in the Pandur II (for maintenance purposes). Reinstalling the Powerpack takes another 20 minutes.

=== Drivetrain ===
The automatic gearbox is connected to the drivetrain with a system of spiral bevel gears that allows quick coupling. The torque is sent from the gearbox through a two-speed transfer gearbox, four differentials with reduction gearboxes, and the drive shafts to the wheels. In the on-road drive mode, 30% of the torque is sent to the first pair of wheels, 21% to the second pair of wheels, and 49% to the fourth pair of wheels; the third pair of wheels does not receive any torque (8×6). The wheel slip is measured by a system called the "Automatic Drivetrain Management" (ADM). Depending upon the position of the gear selector, the ADM automatically splits the fourth pair of wheels' torque evenly between the fourth and third pair of wheels (i. e. it engages or disengages all-wheel drive), it also engages or disengages the transfer case's reduction gear, and it engages the pair of wheels' differentials in an escalating fashion. The differentials are jaw clutches with a 100% locking rate; thus, they do not allow wheel slip. A few seconds after differential lock engagement, the ADM already turns off the differential lock. A coil spring then disengages the differential lock, which is mechanically prevented if there is still differential torque (this means that, the differential lock remains engaged even though it is "turned off", if one wheel would otherwise spin rather freely; only if both wheels have "grip", the differential lock mechanically disengages). This allows the Pandur II to keep its differentials unlocked most of the time, which drastically reduces the reactive torque within the drivetrain — with all differential locks engaged, one wheel can receive all the torque. The Pandur II's drivetrain can transmit up to 20 kN·m of torque to a single wheel; irreversible deformation occurs at torques of around 30 kN·m.

=== Water jet propulsion and winch ===
The Pandur II has an 80 kN hydraulic winch. The APC had a fording depth of up to 1500 mm — through deeper waters, the Pandur II can swim. For this purpose, the Pandur II has a trim vane, an additional water-water-cooler (without a radiator), a snorkel, and a bilge pump. The two water jet propulsion units are installed in the Pandur II's back; they are mechanically driven through the drivetrain. When the water jet propulsion system is active, the wheels are not driven — this is because they would induce too much drag without providing sufficient propulsion. Compared against a conventional propeller, the water jet propulsion system is less efficient, but more durable and offers better manoeuvrability. The top speed when swimming in calm waters is ≤11 km/h; the Pandur II has a sea state rating of 1–2.

== Production ==
The Pandur 8×8 APC is manufactured in Austria while export versions are also built in the Czech Republic. Between 2007 and 2012, licensed versions were built by Fabrequipa in Portugal.

== Variants by country ==
=== Portuguese variants ===
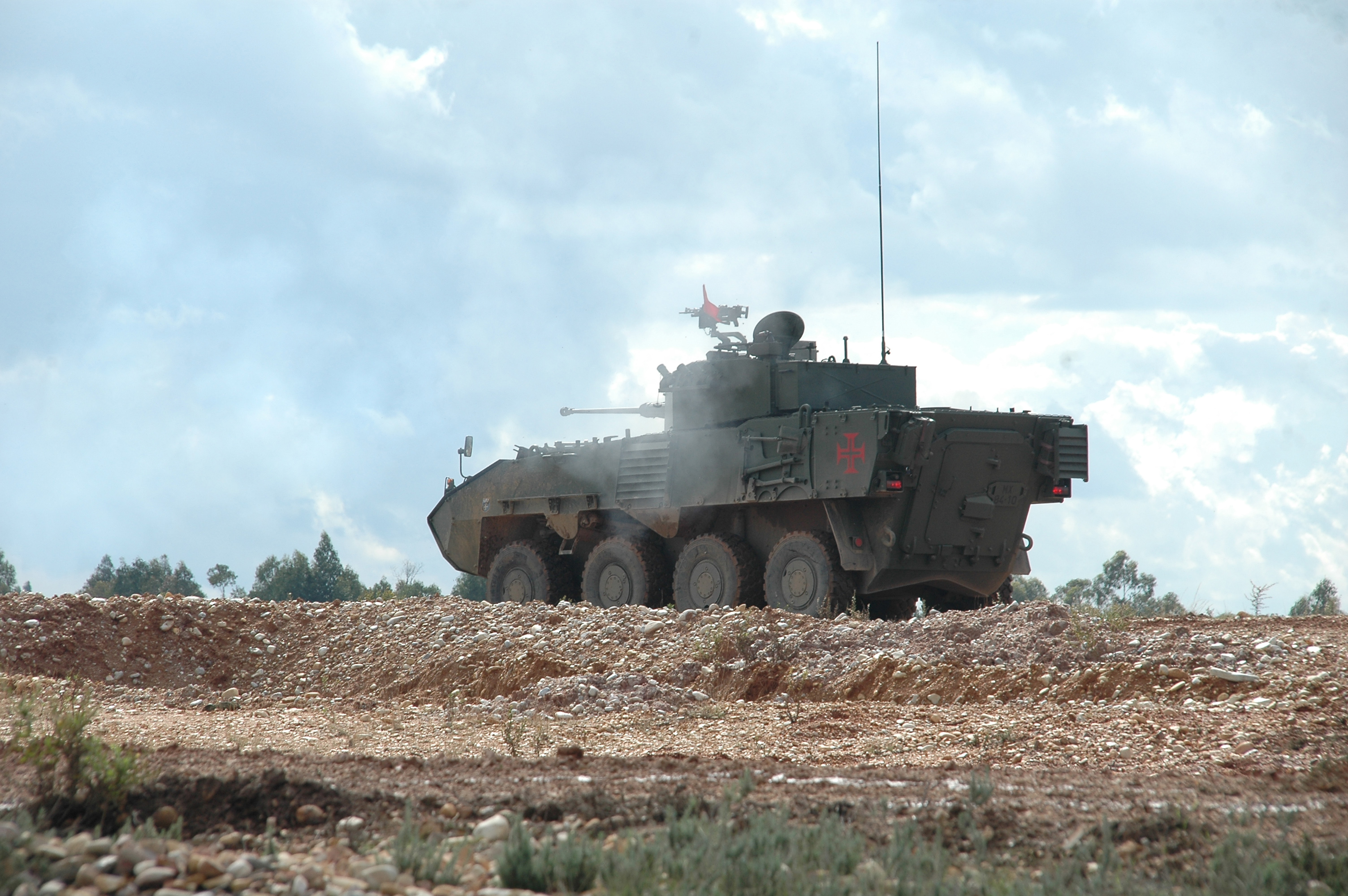
A Portuguese Army Pandur II with an SP30 turret with 30 mm gun.

In 2005, the Portuguese government signed a deal worth 364 million euros to acquire 260 Pandur II armoured vehicles, with an option for further 33 worth 140 million euros, to equip the Portuguese Intervention Brigade of the Portuguese Army and the marines of the Portuguese Navy. Portugal was the first country to buy the Pandur II. The sale of Pandur II to Portugal includes an associated offset agreement for a value of 516 million euro. The Pandur II (Viatura Blindada de Rodas) for the Portuguese Army is fitted with Steyr add-on armour that provides Level 4 protection according to STANAG 4569. The vehicles for the marines are equipped with Level 3 armour and have a cargo ramp instead of the original doors.

==== Legal dispute ====
In 2002, the Portuguese Ministry of Defence decided that they would need new 8×8 APCs. After they had requested for tender on 14 August 2003, three companies — (Finnish arms maker Patria Oyj, Steyr-Daimler-Puch Spezialfahrzeuge (now part of General Dynamics), and MOWAG (also part of General Dynamics)) — made their offers. In December 2004, Steyr-Daimler-Puch Spezialfahrzeuge's Pandur II was chosen; the Portuguese Ministry of Defence signed a 365 million Euro contract about the purchase of 260 units of the Pandur II with General Dynamics on 15 February 2005. The contract also included an option of additional 33 units. The first 260 units of the Pandur II were supposed to be built by General Dynamics European Land Combat Systems in Austria (41 units) and by Fabrequipa in Portugal (219 units), from 2006 to 2009; on 27 January 2007, production at Fabrequipa commenced. In March 2009 General Dynamics announced that they intended to move the production from Portugal to Czechia. On 8 May 2010, the Portuguese Minister of Defence announced that the Ministry of Defence would charge General Dynamics with breach of contract, because they had failed to deliver all 260 units. The contract with General Dynamics was terminated by the Ministry of Defence in October 2012 — until that date, 166 units had been built. Then began a process of negotiation leading to an agreement in September 2014 — General Dynamics agreed upon delivering 22 more units of the Pandur II until August 2015. The additional 33 units option was never used.

In January 2005, General Defence's competitor Patria Oyj accused General Dynamics of "misconducts during the tender and contract formation procedures". Thus, Patria Oyj called for the legal suspension of the contract awarding to General Dynamics at the Public Attorney's Office of the Administrative Court in Lisbon. Patria Oyj's appeal was rejected by Lisbon's Court in February 2005. After General Dynamics had failed to deliver all units of the Pandur II, the Portuguese Public Prosecutor announced on 20 August 2010 that he would investigate corruption charges regarding the Pandur II contract awarding to General Dynamics. However, a case was never mounted against General Dynamics, and no further action was taken.

==== List of all Portuguese Pandur II ====
- 105 Infantry Carrier Vehicles with a 12.7 mm machine gun
- 7 Infantry Carrier Vehicles with a 12.7 mm machine gun installed in a Protector M151 RWS
- 16 Command Vehicles
- 7 Recovery Vehicles
- 8 Medical Evacuation Vehicles
- 5 Anti-tank Guided Missile Launchers – variant with TOW ITAS (Tube-launched, Optically tracked, Wire-guided Improved Target Acquisition System) missile launcher
- 30 Infantry Fighting Vehicles – variant with SP30 turret with 30 mm gun.
- 6 Signalling Vehicles
- 4 Surveillance Vehicles

=== Czech variants ===
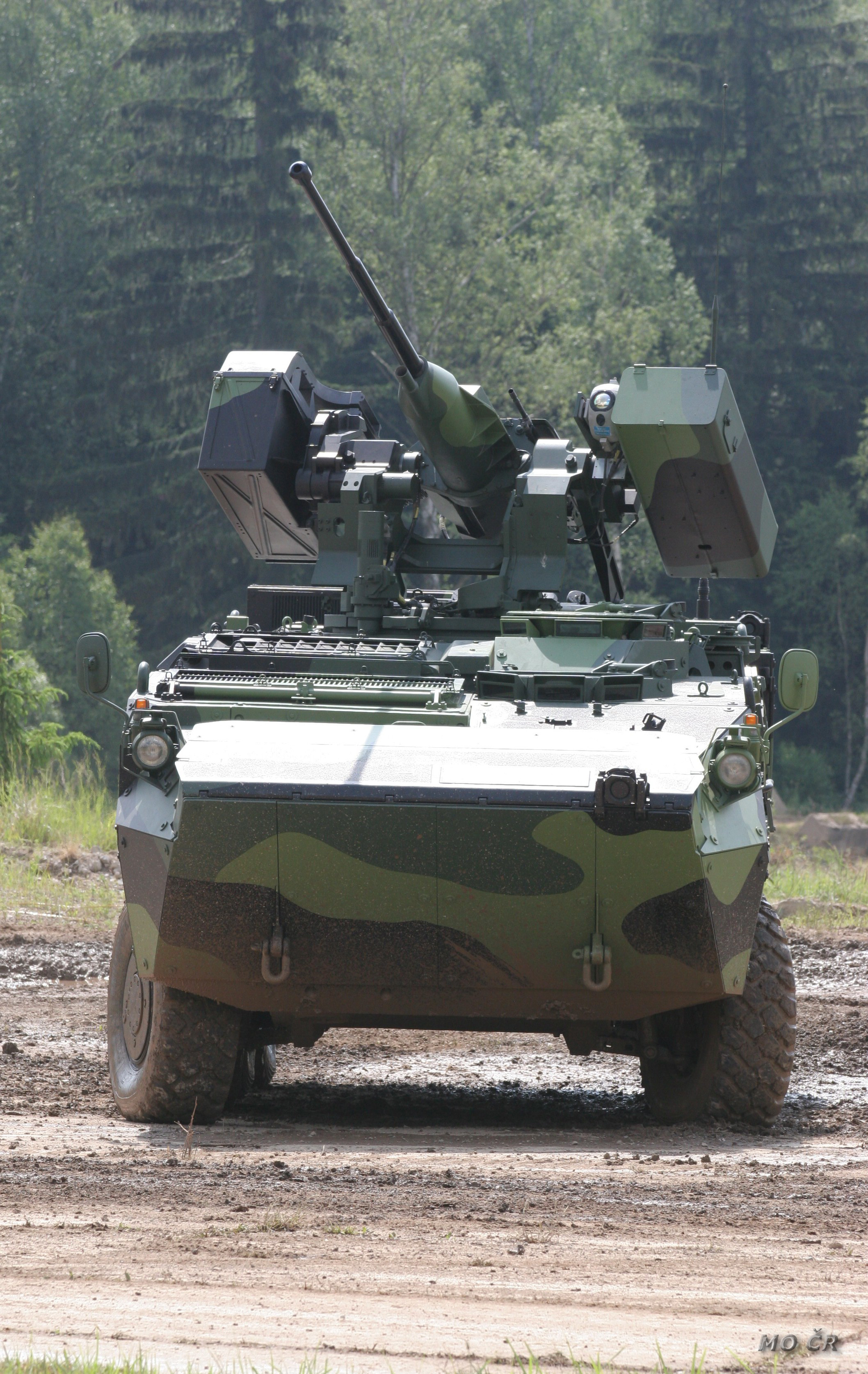
Pandur II being tested by the Czech Army

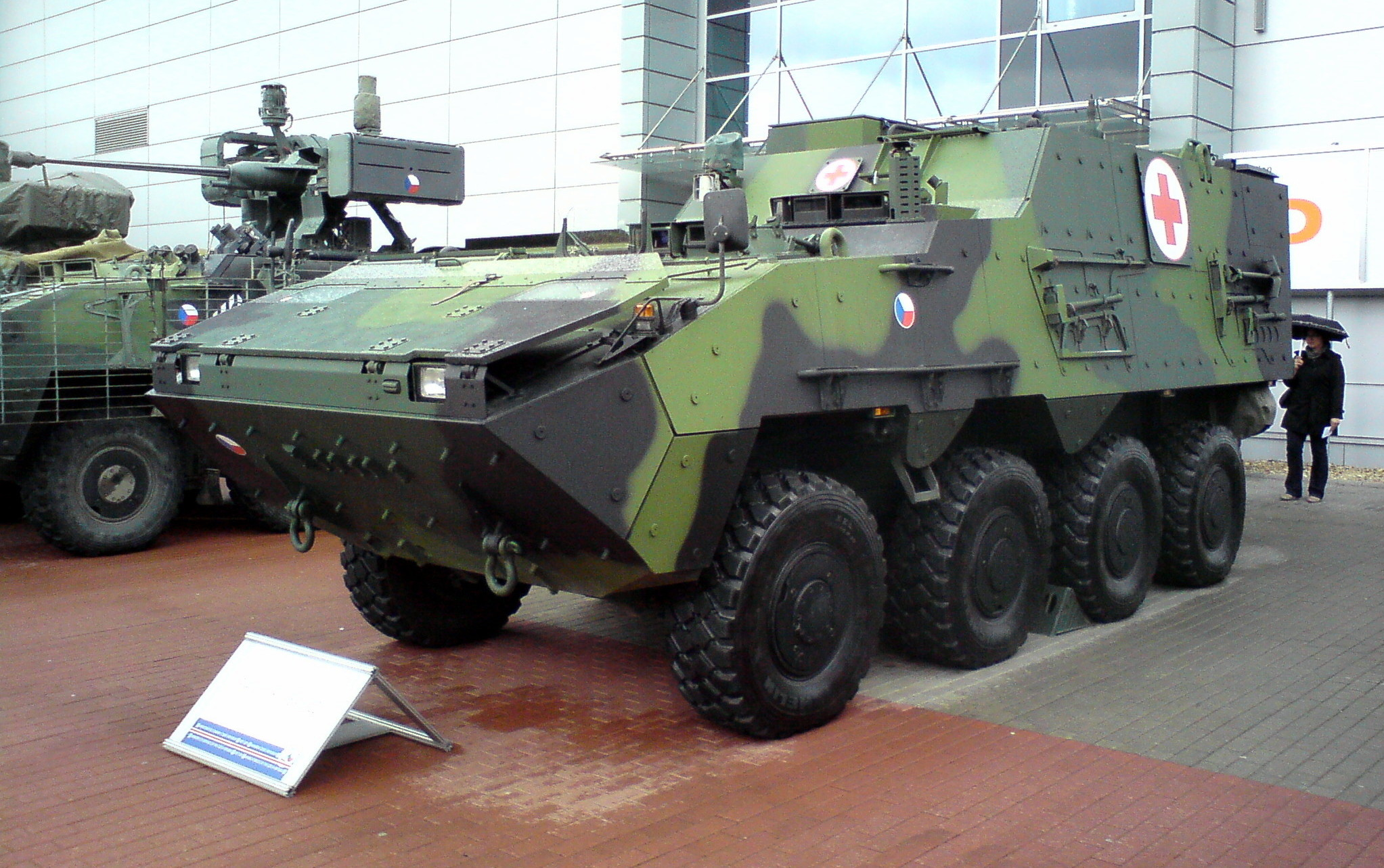
KOT-Zdr

The Czech Army use the Pandur II. In total, they have purchased 127 units.

- KBVP: Wheeled infantry fighting vehicle, equipped with the Elbit Samson RCWS-30 turret (ATK MK44 30mm, 7.62 mm machine gun, Spike missile, smoke grenades)

(72 units purchased 2009-2013)

- KBVP M1 RVS: A modified variant for service in Afghanistan, with additional multilayer and bar armour, improved electronics, and without water jet propulsion.

(4 units purchased in August 2010)

- KBV-VR: Wheeled infantry fighting vehicle (company command post)

(11 units purchased)

- KBV-Pz — průzkumné kolové bojové vozidlo (Wheeled reconnaissance fighting vehicle) fitted without a battlefield surveillance radar.

(8 units purchased)

- KBV-PZLOK — kolové bojové vozidlo průzkumné s radiolokátorem (Wheeled reconnaissance fighting with radar) fitted with a battlefield surveillance radar.

(8 units purchased)

- KOT-Zdr — kolový obrněný transportér zdravotnický (Wheeled armoured personnel carrier for paramedics)

(4 units purchased)

- KOT-Ž — kolový obrněný transportér ženijní (Wheeled armoured personnel carrier for engineers)

(4 units purchased)

- KOV-S — kolové obrněné vozidlo spojovací (Wheeled armoured radio vehicle)

(14 units purchased)

- KOV-VŠ — kolové obrněné vozidlo velitelsko-štábní (Wheeled armoured vehicle for command and staff)

(6 units purchased)

=== Indonesian variant ===
==== Pindad Cobra 8×8 ====
On 24 November 2016 Indonesian government ordered an undisclosed number of Pandur II 8×8 APCs (including Tatra trucks and M3 Amphibious Rigs) for US$39 million from the Czechoslovak Group which has an agreement with General Dynamics to produce, maintain, and market these vehicles in Asia and Central and Eastern Europe. In September 2017, Indonesia reportedly received four Pandur II 8×8s. The four Pandur IIs made their first public appearance at the 72nd Indonesian National Armed Forces Day celebration on 5 October 2017.

On 12 April 2019, the Indonesian Minister of Defense and Pindad signed a contract worth US$80 million for another 22 units of Pandur II 8×8 that supposed to be manufactured locally as the Pindad Cobra 8×8 Infantry Fighting Vehicle (IFV).

On 25 March 2020, the Czechoslovak Group announced that the Czech companies in coordination with local producers will deliver 23 units of Pandur II 8×8 to Indonesia, in following the contract was signed in December 2019.

On 22 February 2022, Indonesian Minister of Defense Prabowo Subianto witnessed the signing of the cooperation contract between the Ministry of Defense of Republic of Indonesia and Excalibur International, a subsidiary of the Czechoslovak Group (CSG), at Ministry of Defense office, in Jakarta. The cooperation contract includes a license agreement for the Pandur II 8×8 armored vehicle, carried out by the President Director of PT. Pindad Abraham Mose with Michal Stranad, CEO of the CSG group, where PT Pindad receives a Transfer of Technology (ToT) to assemble special specifications according to the needs of the Indonesian Army.

On 13 August 2023, Indonesia reportedly started to received another 11 units of Pandur II 8×8s.

On 28 February 2024, Pindad hand overed 10 units Pandur II 8×8 infantry fighting vehicles to the Indonesian Army. Furthermore, on 2 October 2024, 23 units of Pandur II 8×8 ordered by the Indonesian Ministry of Defense were delivered by Pindad to the Indonesian Army.

18 units of the Indonesian Army's Pandur II 8×8, along with 12 Pindad Anoa 6×6, will be sent to Lebanon to be operated by the Indonesian 2025 Task Force to UNIFIL (United Nations Interim Force In Lebanon) for peacekeeping mission.

Pindad Cobra 8×8 specifications:

- Turret system: Unmanned turret Elbit System, Ares UT30 MK II.
- Main armament: Northrop Grumman Mk44 Bushmaster II, cal. 30 mm.
- Secondary armament: Pindad SM2 V2, cal. 7.62 mm.
- Capacity: Three mechanic personnels (commander, driver and gunner).
- Payload: The rear cabin can accommodate up to eight fully armed troops (up to 8.5 tons).
- Dimensions: Length of 7.5 m; width of 2.67 m; height of 2.1 m.
- Weight: 17.6 tons (standard); 22 tons (with add-on armor).
- Additional protection:
  - Exterior add-on passive armor made by Rafael.
  - Bottom hull coated with SSAB ARMOX 500 (mine/IED resistant).
  - Front Wave Breaker shield.
- Engine: Cummins EURO III diesel engine (455 hp).
- Speed: Maximum 105 km/hour (road); 10 km/hour (water).
- Operational range: Maximum cruise-range 700 km.
- Night Vision System: CDND-1 (Combined Day/Night Day-1) night vision system consists of two prisms cut from special optical glass for an extra wide field of view equipped with anti-laser filters for wavelengths 800, 900, 1064, 1540 nm.

=== Philippine variant ===
The Sabrah light tank wheeled version is a new variant developed and offered by Elbit Systems for the Philippine Army's Light Tank Acquisition Project. It uses the Pandur II 8×8 platform fitted with a new turret armed with a 105 mm gun developed by Elbit in partnership with Denel Land Systems. The Notice of Award (NOA) for the project was issued to Elbit Systems Land by the Department of National Defense in September 2020.

=== Prototypes ===
==== Slovenian KOV "Krpan" ====
The KOV "Krpan" (Kolesno Oklepno Vozilo, "Wheeled Armoured Vehicle") from Sistemska Tehnika Armas is the Slovenian license version of the Pandur II with a number of improvements and with 55% of its components and subsystems produced locally. This APC was proposed to the Slovenian Army but was not bought, because the Army decided to buy the Patria AMV instead.

== Operators ==
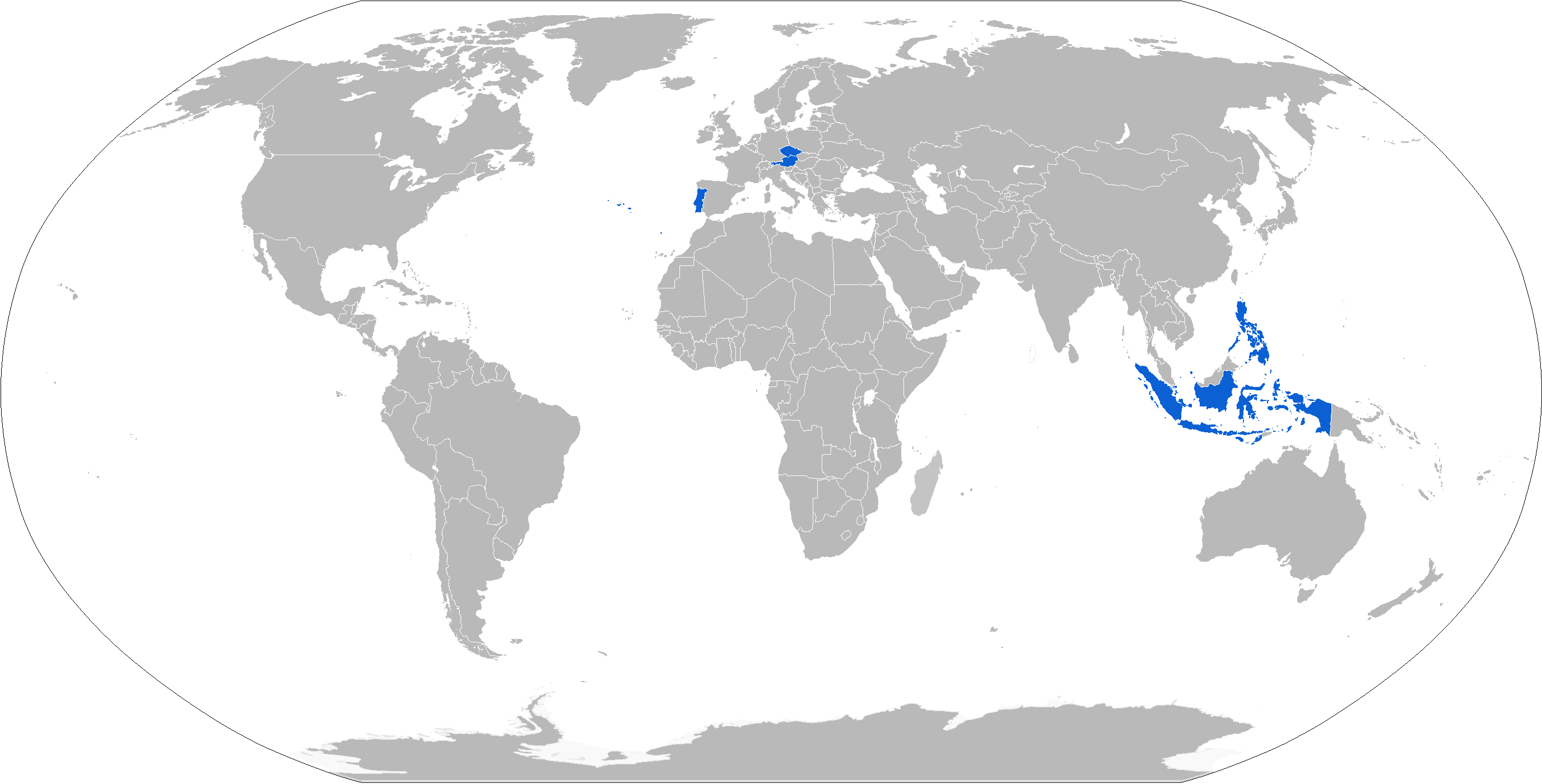
World map – Pandur II operators are marked in blue

=== Current operators ===
Czech Republic (127)
Czech Army: 9 variants are in operation
- 107 produced between 2009 and 2013
- 20 ordered in January 2017 (6 KOVVŠ and 14 KOVS)
The Czech Army plans to modernise the existing fleet of Pandur II between 2027 and 2029.

Indonesia
On 24 November 2016 Indonesian government ordered an undisclosed number of Pandur II 8×8 APCs (including Tatra trucks and M3 Amphibious Rigs) for US$39 million from the Czechoslovak Group which has an agreement with General Dynamics to produce, maintain, and market these vehicles in Asia and Central and Eastern Europe. On 12 April 2019 a contract about the manufacture of another 22 units was signed. These units were supposed to be manufactured locally as the Pindad Cobra 8×8. On 28 February 2024 the Indonesian Army received 10 Pandur II 8×8 fire support vehicles.

Philippines (10)
The Philippine Army ordered a light tank in its Light Tank Acquisition Project won by Elbit Systems. 10 wheeled light tanks that uses the Pandur II 8×8 platform manufactured in Czech Republic are being supplied to the Philippines.

Portugal (188)
The Portuguese Army purchased 188 units in 9 variants and are operated by Intervention Brigade.

=== Potential operators ===
Argentina
Israel is offering a variant of the Pandur II EVO to Argentina with the project VBCR 8×8. The variant is based on the Czech Tatra Pandur II chassis, and would be armed by Elbit equipments.

Czech Republic
In its build-up concept for 2030, the Czech Army plans to modernise the Pandur II and to purchase additional vehicles, the Pandur II EVO.

=== Lost bids ===
Croatia
In competition against Mowag with the Piranha and the Patria AMV with which it was selected as a finalist, but the Patria AMV ended up winning.

Poland
In 2002, Poland selected the future multi-role vehicle intended to replace the OT-64 SKOT, the BMP-1, some command vehicles, mortar carriers and some armoured engineering vehicles. The competitor for this contract were the Piranha IV, the Pandur 2 (8×8) and the Patria AMV. This last one won the competition, and has been manufactured in Poland under the name KTO Rosomak.

=== Tender ===
Chile (> 200)
The Chilean Army was looking for a successor to its 160 Piraña I 6×6 and 30 Piraña I 8×8. On a long term perspective, more than 200 vehicles are expected to be purchased, but in the meantime, a first phase of the replacement includes a tender for 82 8×8 armoured vehicles. The requirement mentions a maximum weight of 38 tons. The deadline for the selection is dated April 8, 2025. Among the known competitors were.:
- Altuğ by the Turkish BMC
- Patria AMV by the Finnish Patria Group
- Arma by the Turkish Otokar
- Freccia by the Italian Iveco
- K808 White Tiger by the South Korean Hyundai Rotem
- Pandur II 8×8 by the Czech Excalibur Army
- Stryker 8×8 by the United States US army (the only offer for already used units)
- Terrex ICV by the Singapore ST Engineering
