= Army Geospatial Information Center =

Coordinates: 38.7783°N 9.1137°W

Portuguese Army Geospatial Information Center
- Centro de Informação Geoespacial do Exército; CIGeoE
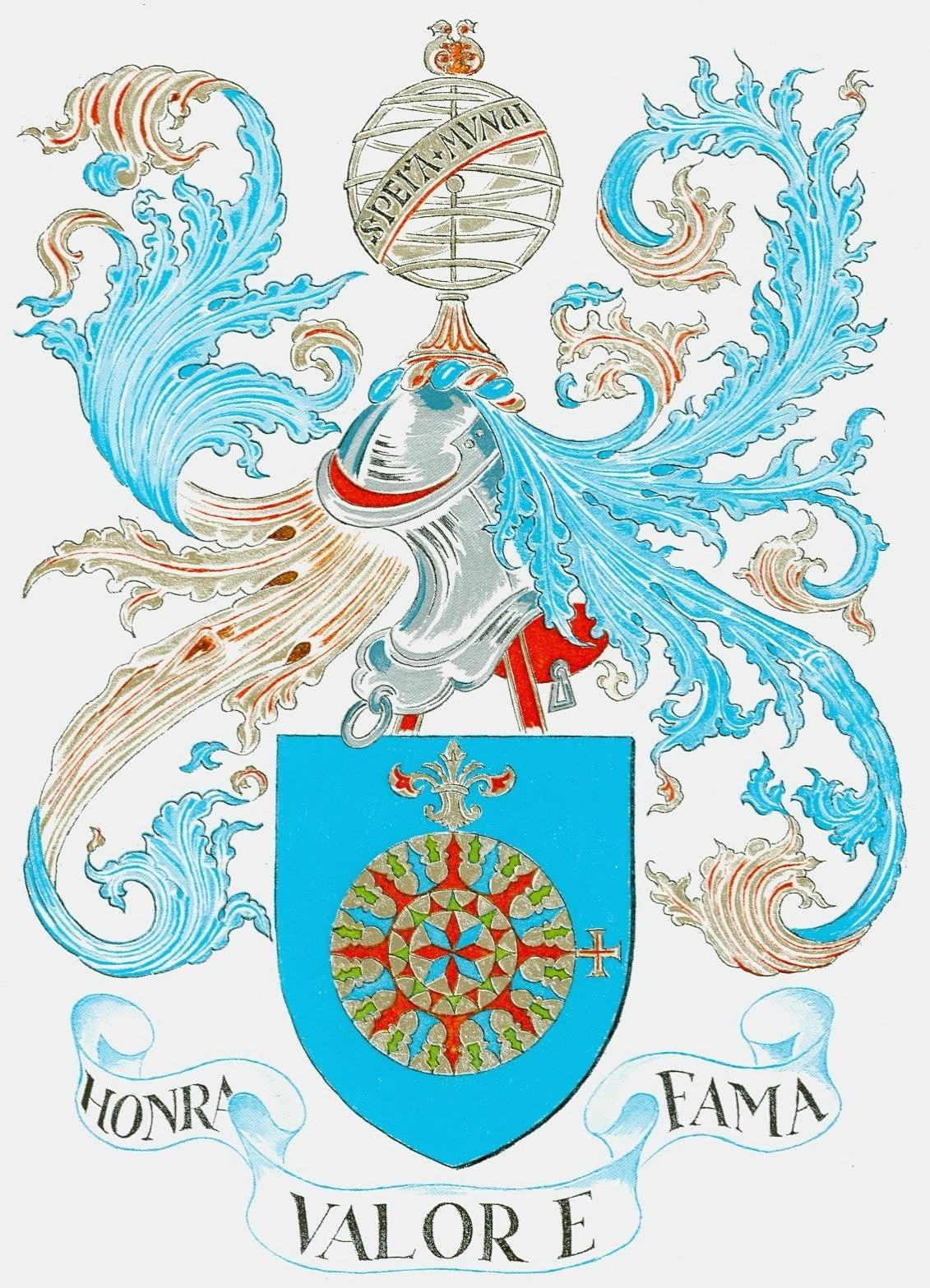
- CIGeoE coat of arms
- Active: 1932;– present
- Country: Portugal
- Allegiance: Portuguese Army
- Branch: Army
- Role: Military geography, cartography, geospatial intelligence
- Part of: Army Logistics Command
- Garrison/HQ: Lisbon
- Patron: Brigadier Neves Costa
- Motto(s): Honra, valor e fama (Honor, Valour and Fame)
- Anniversaries: 24 November 1932
- Website: www.igeoe.pt

Commanders
- Director: Colonel

The Army Geospatial Information Center (Portuguese: Centro de Informação Geoespacial do Exército; CIGeoE) is the military geographical, cartographical and geospatial intelligence agency of the Portuguese Army.

The main mission of the CIGeoE is to provide the Army and the other branches of the Armed Forces of Portugal, as well as the civil community, with geographic information, ensuring the implementation of activities related to the geographical science, cartographic technique and the promotion and development of scientific and technological research actions in the field of geographical support and geomatics. This mission includes the geospatial intelligence (GEOINT) and imagery intelligence (IMINT) activities in support of the Armed Forces.

Besides its main mission, CIGeoE is in charge of contributing to the operational forces of the Portuguese Army with its Geospatial Support Unit (UnApGeo).

== History ==
The present CIGeoE was created in 1932, as the Army Cartographic Services (SCE). The SCE were renamed Army Geographical Institute (IGeoE) in 1993 and Army Geospatial Information Center (CIGeoE) in 2015.

The SCE, IGeoE and CIGeoE are the successors of former Portuguese military geographical organizations, like the Royal Maritime, Military and Geographic Society (created in 1798), the Royal Military Archives (created in 1802) and the Military Cartography Section of the Army Staff (created in 1911).

== Organization ==
The Centro de Informação Geoespacial do Exército includes:

- Board of directors (including the Director, the Deputy Director and the Staff);
- Cartographic Production Centre (CPC);
- Military Geographic Documentation Centre (CDGM)
- Development and Information Management Centre (CDGI);
- Geographic Training Centre (CFG);
- General Support Division (RAG)
