= Intervention Brigade (Portugal) =

- Brigada de Intervenção
- The insignia of the Grupo de Auto-Metralhadoras
- Active: 2006–present
- Country: Portugal
- Branch: Portuguese Army
- Nickname: BrigInt

The Intervention Brigade (Portuguese: Brigada de Intervenção) or BrigInt is an infantry brigade in service with the Portuguese Army. It was created in 2006 from the Light Intervention Brigade (Brigada de Intervenção Ligeira), which was itself the heir of the former Special Forces Brigade (Brigada de Forças Especiais).

== International missions ==
- Kosovo Force in Kosovo;
- International Security Assistance Force in Afghanistan;
- MINUSCA in Central African Republic;
- Tailored Forward Presence in Romania.

== Organization ==
The brigades operational units are listed below. Under the Portuguese system regiments are responsible for the training, maintenance and sustainment of the operational units, but are not operational units themselves. I.e. the 6th Cavalry Regiment trains, maintains and sustains the Intervention Brigade's Reconnaissance Group, but the regiment itself is not an operational unit and not part of the brigade during wartime.

- Intervention Brigade (Brigada de Intervenção), in Coimbra
  - Command and Services Company (Companhia de Comando e Serviços), in Coimbra
  - Cavalry Regiment No. 6 (Regimento de Cavalaria N.º 6), in Braga
    - Reconnaissance Group (Grupo de Reconhecimento), with Pandur II armoured personnel carriers
  - Infantry Regiment No. 13 (Regimento de Infantaria N.º 13), in Vila Real
    - 1st Wheeled Mechanized Infantry Battalion (1.º Batalhão de Infantaria Mecanizado de Rodas)
  - Infantry Regiment No. 14 (Regimento de Infantaria N.º 14), in Viseu
    - 2nd Wheeled Mechanized Infantry Battalion (2.º Batalhão de Infantaria Mecanizado de Rodas)
  - Infantry Regiment No. 19 (Regimento de Infantaria N.º 19) (Training unit), in Chaves
  - Artillery Regiment No. 5 (Regimento de Artilharia N.º 5), in Vendas Novas
    - Towed 15,5 Field Artillery Group (Grupo de Artilharia de Campanha 15,5 Rebocado), with M114A1 155mm towed howitzers
    - Surveillance Systems Company (Companhia de Sistemas de Vigilância) (operationally assigned to the Information, Surveillance, Target Acquisition and Reconnaissance Group, Rapid Reaction Brigade)
  - Anti-Aircraft Artillery Regiment No. 1 (Regimento de Artilharia Antiaérea N.º 1), in Queluz
    - Anti-aircraft Artillery Group (Grupo de Artilharia Antiaérea), with FIM-92 Stinger man-portable air-defense systems
  - Engineer Regiment No. 3 (Regimento de Engenharia N.º 3), in Espinho
    - Medium Combat Engineer Company (Companhia de Engenharia de Combate Média)
    - 2nd General Support Engineer Company (2.ª Companhia de Engenharia de Apoio Geral) (operationally assigned to the Engineer Battalion, Engineer Regiment No. 1)
  - Intervention Brigade Support Unit (Unidade de Apoio da Brigada de Intervenção), in Coimbra

== Equipment ==
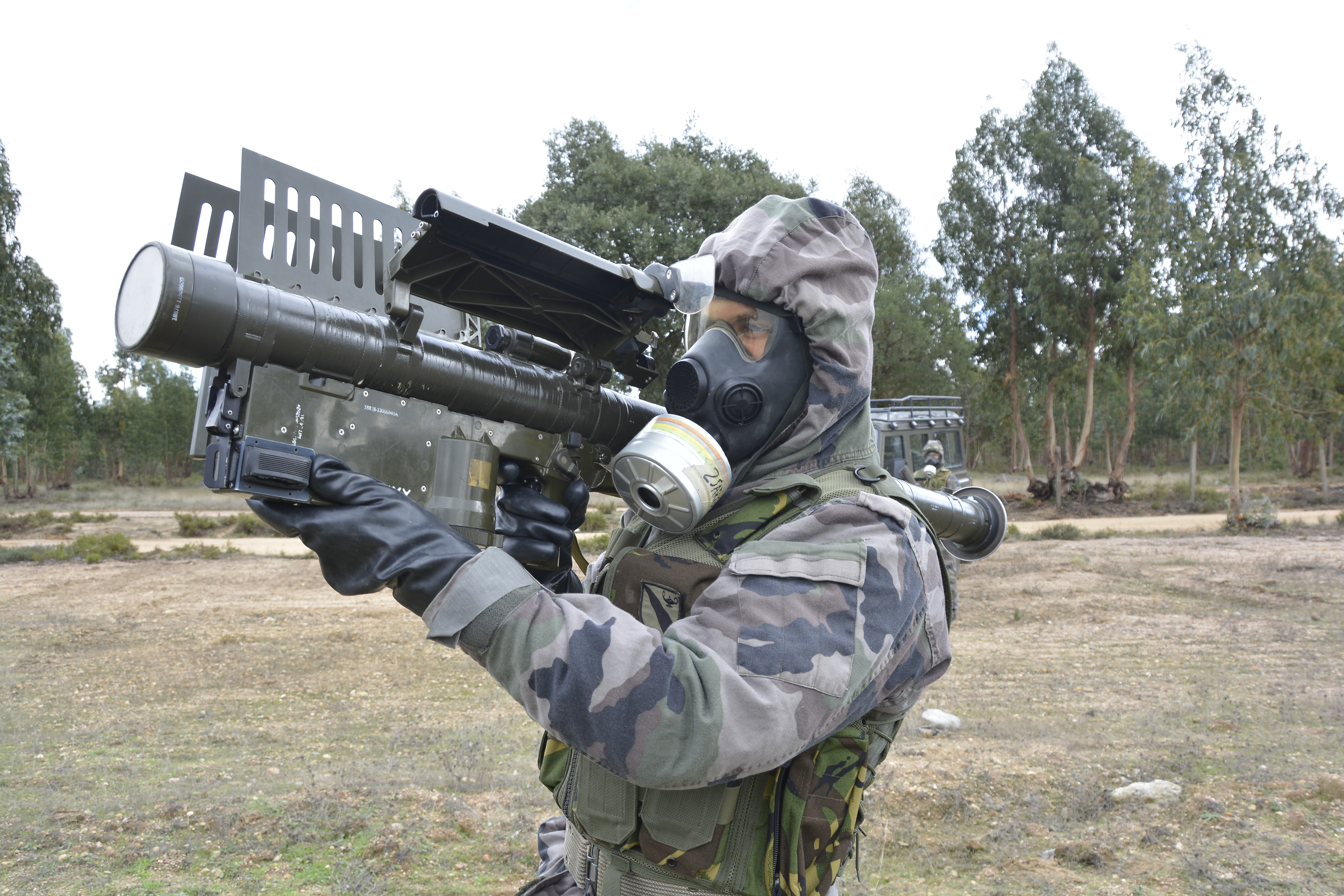
Portuguese soldier from the Anti-aircraft Artillery Regiment No. 1 of the Intervention Brigade.

Infantry equipment:

- Glock 17 Gen 5
- FN SCAR-L STD
- FN SCAR-H STD
- FN Minimi Mk3
- Browning M2HB
- Benelli Supernova
- Tampella B
- L16 A2
- Carl Gustav M3
- MILAN
- BGM-71 TOW
- M72A3 LAW
- FIM-92 Stinger

Armored Vehicles
Name	Origin	Number	Image	Notes
Pandur II	Austria Portugal	188		Several versions made under license in Portugal by Fabrequipa. Some units will receive120mm mortars.: 105 infantry carrier vehicle (with M2 Browning); 7 infantry carrier vehicle (with RWS); 30 infantry fighting vehicle (with 30mm autocannon); 5 anti-tank guided missile vehicle (with TOW 2); 16 command post vehicle; 7 recovery and maintenance vehicle; 8 medical evacuation vehicle; 6 radio access point station vehicle; 4 reconnaissance and surveillance vehicle (with BOR-A 550 radar)
Commando V-150	United States	15		Acquired 15 units with a 90mm cannon and M60E/D machine guns in 1989. All units are in service with the Group of Recognition, based on Cavalry Regiment nº6.
HMMWV M1025A2	United States	-		Known in the army as the Auto Blindado Reconhecimento 1.25 ton, and this variant is the mf/00. Received in 2025 by the 5th Artillery Regiment.
Field artillery
M114A1	United States	12		40 units received in 1983.: 12 in service with the 5th Artillery Regiment; > 6 donated to Ukraine; Some stored.
Firefinder radar
AN/TPQ-36 Firefinder radar	United States	2		Used by 5th Artillery Regiment to detect and track incoming mortar, artillery and rocket fire to determine the point of origin for counterbattery fire.
Unmanned aerial vehicles
Griffon Aerospace MQM-170 Outlaw	United States	-		Target drone, operated by Anti-aircraft Artillery Regiment No. 1.
AeroVironment RQ-11 Raven	United States	36		36 aircraft or twelve systems (together with associated services and equipment) were purchased through the NSPA on 20 August 2018.
DJI Matrice 300 RTK	China	-		Used by Intervention Brigade for surveillance.
Autel EVO II Dual 640T Enterprise V2	China	-		Seen in use for the first time in 2023.
Autel DragonFish	China	-		Seen in use with the Intervention Brigade.
MyFlyDream Nimbus Tricopter 1800	China	12		Unmanned aerial vehicle with VTOL capacity, used by Anti-aircraft Artillery Regiment No. 1.
