= List of equipment of the Portuguese Army =

This is a list of equipment in service with the Portuguese Army.

== Individual gear ==
=== Clothing and protection ===
Model	Image	Origin	Type	Camo pattern (type)	Environment / colours	Quantity	Notes
Standard-issue equipment
SCS; Soldier Combat System		Portugal	Bulletproof vest, combat helmet, uniform, gloves, military boot and holster	M18 – padrão multi-terreno (mix of pattern type flecktarn / disruptive)	Universal	> 12,000	New standard issue uniform, distributed gradually sincy 2019, widely in use by all army units since 2024. The new equipment includes: ballistic helmets, protective glasses, maxillofacial protection, ballistic vests, Kevlar elbow pads, protective gloves, boots, watches and physiological monitors on the wrist.
PASGT; Personnel Armor System for Ground Troops		United States; United Kingdom	Combat helmet and uniform	DPM; Disruptive Pattern Material	Temperate / central Europe	> 30,000	Former standard issue uniform, introduced in the 90s in the Portuguese Army, consisting of ballistic helmets, vests and uniforms. It is currently in the process of being replaced by the new uniform known as SCS - Soldier Combat System.
Special forces equipment
Special forces gears		Norway; United Kingdom; United States	Bulletproof vest, combat helmet and uniform	MultiCam	Universal	> 1,000	The clothing and accessories use the MultiCam pattern. Protection: Helmet: Ops Core; Bulletproof vests: THOR (NFM Group); Warrior Assault; Other: Source Tactical Gear: 3 liter Rider tactical hydration bag; Gears used by special and elite forces of the Portuguese Army: CTOE (Centro de Tropas de Operações Especiais); Commando: Regimento de Comandos, Paratroopers: Tropas Paraquedistas; Until the new SCS gears entered service, it was also used by the regular troops in foreign operations.
Snow Camouflage Suit		–	Snow camouflage	–	–	–	Used by personnel from the Special Operations Troops Center in snowy environments.
Specialised equipment
Saab Barracuda SOTACS		Sweden	Ghillie suit	–	–	–	Used by Portuguese snipers.
Advanced Bomb Suit	(Illustration)	Canada	Bomb suit	–	–	–	Used by the explosive ordnance disposal teams of the 1st Engineering Regiment.

=== Electronic equipment ===
Model	Image	Origin	Type	Quantity	Notes
Targeting equipment
Newcon Optik 7×42 LRB 6K	(illustration)	Canada	Binocular with laser rangefinder	–	Used by artillery and mortar advanced observation units.
Elbit Systems Coral-CR		Israel	Binocular with laser rangefinder	–	Used by artillery and mortar advanced observation units for ISTAR (Intelligence, surveillance, target acquisition and reconnaissance) missions.
Safran-Vectronix MOSKITO		Switzerland	Multifunction IR goggles (laser range finder, laser pointer, compass, inclinometers)	–	Used for ISTAR (Intelligence, surveillance, target acquisition and reconnaissance).
Jenoptik NYXUS Bird Long Range	–	Germany	Multifunction IR goggles (laser range finder)	214	Used for observation, intelligence, surveillance.
Handling equipment
AN/PVS-14		United States	Night-vision device	–	
AN/PVS-21		United Kingdom	Night-vision goggles	–	Used by the special forces.
Senop VVLITE		Finland	Night-vision device	1,485	The device can also be used with a red dot sight.
Miscellaneous electronic equipment
Galaxy S20 TE - ATAK; Android Tactical Assault Kit	–	South Korea; United States	Mobile device	–	Roles: Tactical mapping, navigation, secure communication, and intelligence sharing.
AN/PSN-11 PLGR		United States	Handheld precision lightweight GPS receiver	–	

== Weapons ==
=== Light weapons ===
Model	Variant	Image	Origin	Type	Calibre	Notes
Combat Knife
Extrema Ratio Fulcrum	–		Italy	Bayonet	–	Acquired in 2019 along with the FN SCAR L and H rifles. Can be attached to the end of both rifles.
Handguns
Glock 17	Gen 5 FS		Austria	Semi-automatic pistol	9×19mm Parabellum	Service pistol. 3,910 units purchased between 2019 and 2020 to replace the following pistols that were in service with the Portuguese Army: Walther P38, SIG P228, Heckler & Koch USP and Beretta 92.
Heckler & Koch P30	–		Germany	Semi-automatic pistol	9×19mm Parabellum	Some units received by Special Operations Troops Centre. Limited use.
Submachine guns
Heckler & Koch MP5	MP5 A5		West Germany; Germany	Submachine gun	9×19mm Parabellum	
Heckler & Koch MP5	MP5 SD6		West Germany; Germany	Submachine gun	9×19mm Parabellum	
Heckler & Koch MP5	MP5 N2		West Germany; Germany	Submachine gun	9×19mm Parabellum	
Heckler & Koch MP5	MP5 KA4		West Germany; Germany	Submachine gun	9×19mm Parabellum	
Assault and battle rifles
FN SCAR	SCAR-L STD		Belgium; United States	Assault rifle	5.56×45mm NATO	Standard service rifle. 15,000 SCAR-L STD purchased in 2019.
FN SCAR	SCAR-H STD		Belgium	Battle rifle	7.62×51mm NATO	390 SCAR-H STD purchased in 2019.
Heckler & Koch HK416	HK416 A5		Germany	Assault rifle	5.56×45mm NATO	Used by Special Operations Troops Centre.
Heckler & Koch HK417	HK417 A2		Germany	Battle rifle	7.62×51mm NATO	Used by Special Operations Troops Centre.
Precision rifles
FN SCAR	SCAR H PR		Belgium; United States	Designated marksman rifle	7.62×51mm NATO	550 SCAR-H PR purchased in 2019.
Heckler & Koch HK417	G28E		Germany	Designated marksman rifle	7.62×51mm NATO	Used by Special Operations Troops Centre.
Accuracy International Arctic Warfare	AWSF		United Kingdom	Bolt action sniper rifle	7.62×51mm NATO	Used by Special Operations Troops Centre.
Accuracy International AX	AXMC		United Kingdom	Bolt action sniper rifle	7.62×67mm 8.6×70mm	Used by Special Operations Troops Centre.
Anti-material rifles
Barrett M82	M107A1		United States	Anti-materiel rifle	12.7×99mm NATO	Used by Special Operations Troops Centre.
Machine guns
FN Minimi	Minimi 5.56 Mk3		Belgium	Light machine gun	5.56×45mm NATO	Standard light machine gun. 1,000 purchased in 2019 to replace the HK21.
Heckler & Koch MG4	–		Germany	Light machine gun	5.56×45mm NATO	Used by Commandos and Special Operations Troops Centre.
FN Minimi	Minimi 7.62 Mk3		Belgium	General-purpose machine gun	7.62×51mm NATO	Standard GPMG. 400 purchased in 2019 to replace the MG3.
FN MAG	–		Belgium	General-purpose machine gun	7.62×51mm NATO	Used by Portuguese Paratroopers and used as coaxial machine gun (Pandur II IFV and Leopard 2A6).
M1919	–		United States	Heavy machine gun	7.62×63mm (.30-06 Springfield)	Used as coaxial machine gun on VBL armoured vehicles.
Browning M2	M2HB		United States	Heavy machine gun	12.7×99mm NATO	Used on tripods and mounted on vehicles.
Shotguns
Benelli M4	–		Italy	Semi-automatic shotgun	12 gauge	
Benelli Supernova	–		Italy	Pump action shotgun	12 gauge	380 purchased in 2020.
Fabarm STF 12	–		Italy	Pump action shotgun	12 gauge	Used by the Special Operations Troops Centre.
Grenade launchers
Heckler & Koch HK269	–		Germany	Under barrel grenade launcher	40×46 mm LV	Operated with the Heckler & Koch HK416 rifles by the Special Operations Troops Centre.
FN40GL	FN 40GL Mk2		Belgium	Under barrel grenade launcher	40×46 mm LV	2,000 purchased in 2019, used with the FN SCAR L or individually.
Milkor MGL	MGL Mk1		/ South Africa	Grenade launcher	40×46 mm LV	Used by the Commandos, Paratroopers and Special Operations Troops Centre.
Heckler & Koch GMG	–		Germany	Automatic grenade launcher	40×53 mm HV	30 units purchased in 2018.
SB LAG 40	LAG SB M1		Spain	Automatic grenade launcher	40×53 mm HV	13 units in service, purchased in 1996.
Mk19	mod 3		United States	Automatic grenade launcher	40×53 mm HV	Purchased in 1990.
Anti-tank weapons
M72 LAW	M72 A3		Norway; United States	Rocket-propelled grenade	66mm	> 7,000 units received by the army (locally known as m/78): A3 variant received in 2021; EC Mk1 variant received in 2024.
M72 LAW	M72 EC Mk1		Norway; United States	Rocket-propelled grenade	66mm	> 7,000 units received by the army (locally known as m/78): A3 variant received in 2021; EC Mk1 variant received in 2024.
Carl Gustav	M2U		Sweden	Recoilless rifle	84mm	162 units received. 75 modernised in 2020 by the UAGME.
Carl Gustav	M3		Sweden	Recoilless rifle	84mm	M3 version is in use since 2004.
MILAN	MILAN MILAN 2-T		France; West Germany France; Germany	Anti-tank guided missile	115mm	68 launchers and 799 missiles received. It will be replaced by the EuroSpike LR2 in 2026.
BGM-71 TOW	TOW 2		United States	Anti-tank guided missile (vehicle mounted)	152mm	50 launchers M220, and 1,116 missiles received since 1980. Some launchers are mounted on vehicles: 30 equipped on M113A2; 5 equipped on Pandur II ATGM.

=== Weapon accessories ===
Model	Image	Origin	Type	Used with	Notes
Laser aiming devices
AN/PEQ-16B MIPIM; Mini Integrated Pointing Illumination Module		United States	Laser-light module	SCAR-L STD, SCAR-H STD, HK416 A5, HK417 A2	
Rheinmetall LLM Vario-Ray		Germany	Laser-light module	SCAR-L STD, SCAR-H STD, HK416 A5, HK417 A2	Additional units purchased in 2026.
Rheinmetall LM LowProfile	–	Germany	Laser-light module	SCAR-L STD, SCAR-H STD, HK416 A5, HK417 A2	1,500 purchased in 2021.
Sights
Aimpoint CompM4		Sweden	Red dot sight	SCAR-L STD, SCAR-H STD, HK416 A5, HK417 A2	
Trijicon VCOG 1-6×24		United States	Telescopic sight	SCAR H PR, G28E, AWSF, AXMC	
Schmidt & Bender 1.5-8×26 PM II Short Dot	–	Germany	Telescopic sight	SCAR H PR, G28E, AWSF, AXMC	
Aselsan Mini-TWS-S	–	Turkey	Thermal weapon sight	FIM-92 Stinger	

== Indirect fire ==
=== Mortars ===
Model	Image	Origin	Type	Calibre	Quantity	Notes
Mortar carriers
M106		United States	Mortar carrier	107mm	1	18 purchased from the USA in 1997. 2 M106 retired from service in January 2020 (demilitarised and scrapped). Equipment: 1 × M30 mortar on a rotating base, ≤ 88 × shells; 1 × M2 Browning
M106A2		United States	Mortar carrier	107mm	15	18 purchased from the USA in 1997. 2 M106 retired from service in January 2020 (demilitarised and scrapped). Equipment: 1 × M30 mortar on a rotating base, ≤ 88 × shells; 1 × M2 Browning
M125A1		United States	Mortar carrier	81 mm	3	15 purchased from the USA. 2 M125A2 retired from service in January 2020 (demilitarised and scrapped). Equipment: 1 × 81mm mortar M/937
M125A2		United States	Mortar carrier	81 mm	10	15 purchased from the USA. 2 M125A2 retired from service in January 2020 (demilitarised and scrapped). Equipment: 1 × 81mm mortar M/937
Bravia Chaimite V600 porta-morteiro		Portugal	Mortar carrier	81 mm	6	The 6 vehicles operated by the 6th Cavalry Regiment in Braga are the last Chaimite armored vehicles in service with the Portuguese Army. Equipment: 1 × 81mm mortar M/937; ≤ 42 × shells
Heavy mortars
Tampella B - Morteiro Tampella Tipo B m/74		Finland	Heavy mortar	120mm	56	56 units in service, of which 9 are operated by the Heavy Fire Battery of the Field Artillery Group of the 4th Artillery Regiment.
M30 mortar		United States	Heavy mortar	107mm	12	Received in 1996.
Infantry mortars
M29A1		United States	Mortar	81mm	130	
L16A2		Canada; United Kingdom	Mortar	81mm	32	
Light mortars
FBP - Morteirete m/68		Portugal	Infantry mortar	60mm	558	

=== Artillery ===
Model	Image	Origin	Type	Calibre	Quantity	Notes
Self-propelled howitzer
M109A5		United States	SPH; Self-propelled howitzer	155mm, L/39	18	18 purchased between 2002 and 2007, succeeding to 6 M109A2. Operated by the Field Artillery Group (GAC 15.5 AP) of the Mechanised Brigade. Planned replacement with the CAESAR Mk 2 (letter of intent signed in February 2025). Note: 5 M109A2 are stored at Santa Margarida Military Camp, and 1 was donated to the Military Museum, in Elvas.
Towed artillery
L119 LG		United Kingdom	Towed howitzer	105mm, L/30	21	21 acquired between 1998 and 1999, succeeding to the M101A1 / M101A1L. 18 operated by the Rapid Reaction Brigade (4th Artillery Regiment) and 3 operated by the School of Arms in Mafra, for the instruction of artillerymen. It can be transported by the EH-101 helicopter.
M114A1		United States	Towed howitzer	155mm, L/23	12	40 acquired in 1983, 12 operated by the Intervention Brigade (5th Artillery Regiment) as of 2024. Unknown quantity of howitzers donated to Ukraine in 1st trimester 2025 and 4 donated after December 2025. Replacement of the M114 planned with the CAESAR Mk 2 (letter of intent signed in February 2025). 12 would replace the M114, 2 batteries of 6 self-propelled guns.
Ceremonial cannons
Ordnance QF 25-pounder		United Kingdom	Ceremonial cannon / former field gun	88mm, L/28	12	132 purchased (108 Mk. I and 24 Mk. III). Used for a ceremonial role by the following units: 1st Anti-aircraft Artillery Regiment; 2nd Garrison Regiment; 3rd Garrison Regiment; 5th Artillery Regiment

=== Indirect fire electronic systems ===
Model	Image	Origin	Type	Role	Notes
Radars
AN/PPS5-B		United States	Ground surveillance radar	–	Used by the 3rd Cavalry Regiment on Panhard M11 vehicles.
AN/TPQ-36 firefinder / HMMWV M1097A2		United States	Counter-battery radar	–	Six vehicles with two radars received in 2003. The tow-vehicle is unarmoured, and used to tow the radars.
RATAC-S		France	Battlefield reconnaissance and target acquisition radar	–	
Command and control
Raytheon AFATDS; Advanced Field Artillery Tactical Data System	–	United States	Automated command and control system	–	Automated command-and-control software for coordinating, planning, and executing fire support.
EyeCommand Battlefront	–	Portugal	Artillery battlefield management system	–	Software supplied by Critical Software, and used from a DT10-M multi-functional rugged tablet. It is being integrated to the Raytheon AFATDS.

== Armoured vehicles ==
=== Armoured vehicles ===
Model	Image	Origin	Type	Quantity	Notes
Main battle tanks
Leopard 2A6NL / PRT		Germany	MBT; Main battle tank	34	37 Leopard 2A6 MBT acquired second-hand from the Netherlands in 2008. On top of these, the acquisition included 1 Leopard 2 DTV and 1 Leopard 2A4 for spare parts. In March 2023, Portugal transferred 3 tanks to Ukraine (support against the Russian invasion). Initial modifications: EID ER 525 (radio); CriticalSoftware BMS-C2 (battle management system); KMW Live Firing Monitoring Equipment (LFME); Mid-life update: contract signed in 2024 to bring the tanks to the Leopard 2A6 PRT standard: Gunner sight: EMES 15 A2 replaced by EMES 15 A3 ATTICA; Commander sight PERI R17 A2 replaced by PERI R17 A3 ATTICA; E-WNA replacement with an electronic one; Electronic cooling; Modernisation of the electrical system (safety, batteries, APU); New fire extinguisher system; Front / rear driver cameras
Leopard 2 DTV		Germany	Military training vehicle	1	In service since 2008, used for the training of tank drivers.
Tank hunters
M113A2		United States	Tank destroyer	18	A total of 30 M113 vehicles were equipped with a TOW missile launcher, of which 18 remain in service. Modernised between 2018 and 2019 to SLM TOW 2 standard.
M901A1 ITV		United States	Tank destroyer	4	Portugal purchased 25 M901 ITV, but due to technical problems, only 4 of the 25 systems were functioning, and therefore delivered. With this purchase, 900 TOW-2 missiles were ordered. The 4 systems were refurbished in 2025, and joined the European Battle Group EUBG 25-2/26-1.
Pandur II ATGM; Anti-tank guided missile	–	Austria; Portugal (licence)	Tank destroyer	5	5 are equipped with a TOW ATGM launcher.
Infantry fighting vehicles
Pandur II IFV		Austria; Portugal (licence)	Infantry fighting vehicle	30	30 in the IFV variant, which are equipped with a SP30 turret: 1 × MK30-2/ABM 30×173 mm; 1 × FN MAG coaxial machine gun; 1 × FN MAG pintle-mounted machine gun; 8 × smoke grenades (76mm)
Armoured personnel carriers
M113A1, M113A2		United States	Armoured personnel carrier, ambulance	145	255 M113A1 and M113A2 received, among which 215 APC, 30 tank destroyers and 10 armoured ambulances. The detailed deliveries: 101 M113A2 received in 1977 from the USA; 104 M113A2 received in 1993 from the Netherlands; 50 M113A1 and A1G received in 1994 from Germany.; Note: 9 M113A1 retired from service in January 2020 (demilitarised and scrapped); Ambulance version retired from active service (10 units); 60 units sent to Ukraine as military aid; 1 unit converted into a remote controlled vehicle; 30 units listed above on "Tank hunters" section; Planned to be replaced by 90 Boxer APC.
Pandur II ICV / RWS; Infantry combat vehicle / Remote weapon station		Austria; Portugal (licence)	Armoured personnel carrier	113	Two sub-variants were purchased: 105 equipped with a pintle-mounted M2 Browning; 7 were mounted with a Kongsberg M151 Protector RCWS
Reconnaissance vehicles
Commando V-150		United States	Reconnaissance vehicle	15	15 vehicles were acquired in 1989, and are now operated by the Reconnaissance Group of the 6th Cavalry Regiment. Equipment: Cockerill Mk3 90mm rifled barrel; M60E/D pintle-mounted machine gun
Pandur II REC; Reconnaissance		Austria; Portugal (licence)	RECCE vehicle	4	Equipment: 1 × FN MAG; 1 × EO/IR surveillance system on a mast; 1 × BOR-A 550 battlefield radar; 8 × smoke grenades (76mm)
VBL (Véhicule blindé léger - Panhard M11D)		France	Scout car	38	The VBL is considered as a light reconnaissance vehicle, they are air transportable. 38 were purchased, and entered service in 1989, and exist in 4 sub-variants of scout vehicles equipped with: 1 × M1919A4; 1 × M1919A4 and 1 × MILAN ATGM; 1 × M2HB; 1 × M1919A3 and 1 × AN/PPS5-B field radar; As of 2025, Portugal is planning to modernise the fleet of VBL.
Infantry mobility vehicles
HMMWV M1025A2		United States; Israel (local modification)	Armoured car	24	Known in the army as the Auto Blindado Reconhecimento 1.25 ton, and this variant is the mf/00. 22 vehicles of this variant received add-on armour from Plasan Sasa with the APK kit.
HMMWV M1151A1 and A2		United States	Armoured car	15	Known in the army as the Auto Blindado Reconhecimento 1.25 ton, and this variant is the m/2009. 17 vehicles of this variant received: 15 received as Infantry mobility vehicle; 1 received as Ambulance (retired from service and donated to the Military Museum, in Elvas); 1 received as Communications Vehicle.
URO Vamtac ST5 BN3		Spain	Infantry mobility vehicles	107	139 URO VAMTAC ST5 BN3 ordered in July 2018, among which 107 troop carriers.
Toyota Land Cruiser J200		Japan	Military light utility vehicle	3	Three vehicles acquired in 2012 to replace the armoured Chevrolet Suburban used by the Portuguese Army.
Special forces vehicles
URO Vamtac ST5 BN3		Spain	Special forces vehicles	12	139 URO VAMTAC ST5 BN3 ordered in July 2018, among which 12 vehicles for the special forces (3 command vehicles with SATCOM).
Command and control
M577A2		United States	Command vehicle	< 41	47 M577A2 received between 1996 and 2000. The detailed deliveries: 44 received as Command Post Vehicles; 3 received as Ambulance (retired from service); Notes: 2 M577A2 retired from service in January 2020 (demilitarised and scrapped).; 2 M577A2 Ambulance donated to Ukraine in 2023.; Unknown quantity of M577A2 donated to Ukraine in 2025.; 12 M577A2 to be modernised in 2026.
Pandur II CPV; Command post vehicle		Austria; Portugal (licence)	Command and control vehicle	16	Equipment: 1 × FN MAG pintle-mounted machine gun; 8 × smoke grenades (76mm)
URO Vamtac ST5 BN3	(Illustration)	Spain	Command and control vehicle	7	139 URO VAMTAC ST5 BN3 ordered in July 2018, among which 7 command vehicles. The vehicles are equipped with command posts and SATCOM.
Communications
Pandur II CV; Communications vehicle	(Illustration)	Austria; Portugal (licence)	Communication vehicle	6	Equipped with a radio access point mast, with directional antennas.
HMMWV M1151A2	(Illustration)	United States; Italy (shelter)	Communication vehicle	1	One unit operated by the Signals Regiment, equipped with a light communication shelter supplied by the Italian company, Alex sistemi SpA, along with 5 more identical shelters installed on tactical trucks of the Signals Regiment.
Medical evacuation
Pandur II MEV / AMB; Medevac / ambulance		Austria; Portugal (licence)	Armoured ambulance	8	Equipment: 8 × smoke grenades (76mm)
URO Vamtac ST5 BN3	(Illustration)	Spain; Portugal (shelter)	Armoured ambulance	13	139 URO VAMTAC ST5 BN3 ordered in July 2018, among which 13 medical evacuation vehicles in two versions.The armored medical evacuation module was developed and produced in Portugal, using CompactShield panels from the Portuguese company Beyond Composite.: 8 in service as Ambulances; 5 in service as Emergency and Resuscitation (EMER)
R&D projects
M113 Robotizado		United States; Portugal (local modification)	Armoured robots	1 (+ additional projected)	Portugal, through the Army and the Instituto Superior Técnico, is transforming the M113 into a remote controlled vehicle. The APC variant is planned to be replaced by the Boxer APC, and will become available for transformation.

Note: Among the Pandur II purchase, the initial contract that was signed in 2005, was for 260 vehicles, and it was worth €364 million.

== Unarmoured vehicles ==
=== Tactical vehicles ===
Model	Image	Origin	Type	Quantity	Notes
Utility vehicles
HMMWV M1097A2	(Illustration)	United States	4×4 unarmoured tow vehicle	6	Used by the 5th Artillery Regiment of the Intervention Brigade in two versions: Cargo variant used to tow AN/TPQ-36 firefinder radars; Command and control vehicle, with an shelter equipped with antennas and comunnications systems.
Toyota Land Cruiser HZJ73		Japan; Portugal (licence and local modification)	4×4 utility vehicle	~ 150	Assembly in the Portuguese Toyota factory, Salvador Caetano. Army designation: Toyota Land Cruiser D 4×4 MF/01. 50 units being modernised by Rodasa, between 2026 and 2027.
Land Rover Defender D90 TD SW E 4×4		United Kingdom	4×4 utility vehicle	> 70	Army designation: Land Rover Defender 90 TD SW E 4×4 MF/08.: 70 delivered in 2009; Additional units delivered over the years.
Mitsubishi L200 (fourth generation Di-D)		Japan	4×4 utility pickup	80	Army designation: TG4 Mitsubishi 4×4 L200 MF/08.
Toyota Hilux (eighth generation - GUN125L-DNFSHW 2.4 D4)		Japan; Portugal (local modification)	4×4 utility pickup for wildfire prevention	23	Fleet ordered in 2023, and equipped by Vecargo, with: Rugged notebook; GPS unit; 2-ways portable radio; provisions for EID PRC525 multi-band combat radio system; Bullbar with winch; Rigid truck cap
Command vehicles
Land Rover Defender D110 TD5	(Illustration)	United Kingdom	4×4 command vehicle / 4×4 communications vehicle	70	Since 2007, 70 new Land Rover 110 SW 4×4 light tactical vehicles were delivered to the Army, replacing the UMM Alter light vehicle.
Medical evacuation
Land Rover Defender D110 TD5 ambulance	(Illustration)	United Kingdom; Portugal (local modification)	4×4 ambulance	–	Army designation: Land Rover Defender 4×4 MF/09 Sanitario.
Special forces vehicles
Pinhol Defense SOPS-P MF-11	(Illustration)	United Kingdom; Portugal (local modification)	4×4 commando assault vehicle	13	Vehicle based on the Land Rover Defender 130 TD4, and adapted in Portugal by Pinhol Defence. It is equipped with a shield at the bottom for protection against IED, and can carry multiple types of infantry weapons and light mortars. 8 are operated by the 1st Portuguese Special Operations Land Task Group and 5 by the commandos.

=== Motorcycles ===
Model	Image	Origin	Type	Quantity	Notes
Road motorcycles
Yamaha TDM 900		Japan	Police motorcycle	12	Used by the army police, mostly for traffic management.

=== Light tactical vehicles ===
Model	Image	Origin	Type	Quantity	Notes
Special forces vehicles
Toro Q-150D		Spain; Portugal (local modification)	4×4 airborne light utility vehicle	10	The fleet and associated equipment and services were purchased through the NSPA in 2020 for the Parachute Regiment (RParas). 8 units modified locally by Rodasa Tecnologias in 2026.
Polaris MRZR D4		United States	4×4 all-terrain vehicle	4	The Portuguese Special Operations of the Rapid Reaction Brigade received two MRZR D2, two MRZR 2 and four MRZR D4. Army designation: TP4 SOF MRZR 4.
Polaris MRZR 2 and D2		United States	4×4 all-terrain vehicle	10	The Portuguese Special Operations of the Rapid Reaction Brigade received two MRZR D2, two MRZR 2 and four MRZR D4. In 2024, 6 MRZR 2 were received by the reconnaissance platoons of the Azores and Madeira Garrison Regiments. Army designation: TP2 SOF MRZR 2. Note: The difference between the MRZR 2 and the MRZR D2 is the fuel used. The D2 uses diesel fuel.
Polaris Ranger Crew XP 1000		United States	4×4 all-terrain vehicle	2	Vehicle operated by NBRC defence company of the 1st Engineering Regiment.
Polaris Sportsman MV850		United States	ATV	8	Used by the Portuguese Special Operations of the Rapid Reaction Brigade. 2 trailers were supplied with the 8 vehicles. Army designation: TP1 SOF Polaris 1.

== Logistics ==
=== Tracked vehicles ===
Model	Image	Origin	Type	Capacity	Quantity	Notes
Tracked vehicles
M548 A1		United States	Tracked cargo carrier	5.0 t (11,023 lb)	23	24 units received by the Mechanised Brigade, to transport ammunitions for the M109A5 howitzers.: 1 M548A1 retired from service in January 2020 (demilitarised and scrapped).

=== Transport trucks ===
Model	Image	Origin	Type	Capacity	Quantity	Notes
Light tactical transport trucks
Iveco 40.12		Italy; Portugal (local modification)	4×4 light tactical truck	1.93 t (4,300 lb), or 14 passengers	~ 120	Used in 4 variants: Troops transport; Cargo transport (modified by Galucho); Command and Control (AFATDS); Ambulance.; Army designation: mA/89-90.
Iveco 40.10		Italy; Portugal (local modification)	4×4 light tactical truck	1.5 t (3,300 lb), or 12 passengers	~ 120	Used in 4 variants: Troops transport; Cargo transport (modified by Galucho); Command and Control (AFATDS); Ambulance.; Army designation: mA/89-90.
Tactical transport trucks
Mercedes-Benz Unimog 1100		West Germany	4×4 tactical truck	3.0 t (6,600 lb), or 13 passengers	~ 10	Variants with or without winch. Used to tow L119 LG howitzers of the 4th Artillery Regiment.
Mercedes-Benz Unimog 1300L		West Germany; Germany	4×4 tactical truck	2.0 t (4,400 lb), or 16 passengers	~ 200	Variants with or without winch.
Mercedes-Benz Unimog 1750L		Germany	4×4 tactical truck	5.0 t (11,000 lb), or 19 passengers	~ 200	Variants with or without winch, and with or without knuckle boom crane.
MAN 10.224		Germany; Austria	4×4 tactical truck	4.0 t (8,800 lb)	~ 50	Army Designation: Auto TG 4 ton. TP20
RMMV TGS 18.440 BB CH	(Illustration)	Austria; Germany; Spain (modified by TSD)	4×4 tactical communications truck	~ 7.0 t (15,400 lb)	31	Purchase as part of a batch of 46 trucks intended to transport signal shelters (for the tactical communication and information system SIC-T), 15 of which are equipped with a modular armoured cab.
RMMV TGS 18.440 BB CH	(Illustration)	Austria; Germany; Spain (modified by TSD)	4×4 armoured communications truck	~ 7.0 t (15,400 lb)	15	Purchase as part of a batch of 46 trucks intended to transport signal shelters (for the tactical communication and information system SIC-T), 15 of which are equipped with a modular armoured cab.
RMMV TGS 26.440 BB CH	(Illustration)	Austria; Germany; Spain (modified by TSD)	6×6 truck	~ 10.0 t (22,000 lb)	77	Purchase in 2023 as part of a batch of 61 trucks, 13 of which have a modular armoured cab for general transport. Variants in use: 41 × general transport trucks (13 of which are armoured); 29 × personnel carrier trucks; 16 × container carriers with a HIAB X-HiDuo 072 loader crane; 4 × water tank trucks with a 6 m^{3} (7.8 yd^{3})-capacity; Additional purchase in 2025 of a batch of 29 trucks.
RMMV TGS 26.440 BB CH	(Illustration)	Austria; Germany; Spain (modified by TSD)	6×6 armoured truck	~ 8.0 t (17,600 lb)	13	Purchase in 2023 as part of a batch of 61 trucks, 13 of which have a modular armoured cab for general transport. Variants in use: 41 × general transport trucks (13 of which are armoured); 29 × personnel carrier trucks; 16 × container carriers with a HIAB X-HiDuo 072 loader crane; 4 × water tank trucks with a 6 m^{3} (7.8 yd^{3})-capacity; Additional purchase in 2025 of a batch of 29 trucks.
DAF YA 4440D		Netherlands; Portugal (partial assembly)	4×4 tactical truck	5.0 t (11,000 lb)	300	These trucks are being phased out. Army designation: Auto TG 5 ton DAF YA 4440D.
Iveco 90.17		Italy	4×4 tactical truck	4.0 t (8,800 lb), or 19 passengers	~ 70	These trucks are being phased out. (Portuguese designation: mA/91)
Renault Kerax		France	4×4 tactical truck	–	4	Equipped with shelters.: 2 used by the 1st Anti-aircraft Artillery Regiment with SICCA3 system shelters; 2 used by the Regiment of Maintenance with mobile workshop shelters
General transport trucks
Iveco EuroCargo 65E12		Italy; Portugal (local modification)	4×2 cargo truck	5.0 t (11,000 lb)	~ 20	Used primarily for training drivers of heavy vehicles. Received in two versions: Version 65E12 received in 1994; Version 120-190L in 2019 (Modified by RACELAND)
MAN KAT1 (MAN 4520 6×6 FSB)		Austria; West Germany	6×6 truck	7.0 t (15,400 lb)	16	Used to transport EWK Faltschwimmbrücken bridge components (GDELS Ribbon Bridge).
Mercedes-Benz Atego 715		Germany	4×2 cargo truck	3.0 t (6,600 lb)	~ 80	Army designation: Auto TG 3,3 ton. TP22. In service since 1999.
Mercedes-Benz 1013/1213/ 1217/1222		Germany	4×2 cargo truck	5.0 t (11,000 lb)	~ 40	Received in the 80's from Germany in versions 1013, 1213, 1217 and 1222. Variants in use: Cargo transport; Diesel/Water tank transport; Airport crash tender in Tancos Airfield
Mercedes-Benz SK 2024	(Illustration)	West Germany; Germany	4×4 tipper truck	–	–	Used by the Engineering Regiments.
Scania P114 CB HZ340		Sweden	6×4 tipper truck	–	13	Army designation: Auto TG Scania P114 CB HZ340.
Volvo FMX 420	(Illustration)	Sweden; Portugal (local modification)	8×4 tipper truck	–	3	First purchased in 2020, in service with the third engineering regiment since 2021. Second and third purchased in May 2025. Locally modified by Arvorense. They are used for engineering and emergency missions.
Volvo FMX 420	(Illustration)	Sweden; Portugal (local modification)	8×4 hydraulic hooklift hoist truck	–	2	Used by Nuclear, Biological, Chemical and Radiological Defense Company from the 1st Engineering Regiment. They are equipped with Palfinger PH T17S hookloader and SIBCRA shelters to store CBRN defense equipments.
Volvo FMX 420	(Illustration)	Sweden; Portugal (local modification)	8×4 container sideloader	–	3	Three units ordered in September 2026.
Semi-trucks
Volvo FMX 540	(Illustration)	Sweden	6×4 semi-truck	70.0 t (154,300 lb)	4	The semi-trailers are supplier by: 4-axle low flatbed semi-trailer with ramps supplied by Cimar (Portugal); 2-axle low flatbed semi-trailer with ramps supplied by Invepe (Portugal)
Volvo FH 12 380; Volvo FH 12 420	(Illustration)	Sweden	6×4 semi-truck / 4×2 semi-truck	–	6	6 units purchased in versions FH12 380 and FH12 420.
DAF CF 85.460, DAF CF 85.510	(Illustration)	Netherlands	6×4 semi-truck / 4×2 semi-truck	70.0 t (154,300 lb) / –	3	3 units purchased in versions CF 85.460 and CF 85-510.
Iveco Stralis NP 350	(Illustration)	Italy	4×2 semi-truck	–	2	
MAN 33.362 DFGT		Germany	4×2 semi-truck	–	4	Received in the 90's by the Army.
RMMV TGX 18.420	(Illustration)	Austria; Germany	4×2 semi-truck	–	3	An additional unit ordered in September 2026.
Mercedes-Benz Actros 2041 (second generation)	(Illustration)	Germany	4×4 semi-truck	–	2	
Mercedes-Benz Actros 1840	(Illustration)	Germany	4×2 semi-truck	–	2	
Semi-trailers
M969		United States	Refueler Semi-trailer	–	–	19 m^{3} (5,000 US gal) fuel dispensing tanker
Plataforma Semi-reboque	(illustration)	Portugal	Vehicle transport Semi-trailer	–	–	Used by the army to transport armored vehicles and construction machines.: 2 delivered in 2026 by SHAMROCK (up to 70ton); 3 delivered in 2025 by Invepe (1 up to 40ton and 2 up to 70ton); At least 4 delivered since 2021 by Cimar; Some delivered by LisTrailer.
Plataforma Semi-reboque	(illustration)	Portugal	Cargo transport Semi-trailer	–	–	Used by the army to transport containers and cargo.: Some delivered by Arvorense.

=== Handling vehicles ===
Model	Image	Origin	Type	Capacity	Quantity	Notes
Manitou MHT 10180		France	Heavy telescopic handler	18 t (39,700 lb)	–	Used by the Enginnering Regiments and Army General Material Support Unit.
Manitou MVT 660		France	Telescopic handler	6 t (13,200 lb)	–	
Manitou 1340 SLT		France	Telescopic handler	4 t (8,800 lb)	–	Used by the Enginnering Regiments.
Komatsu FD150		Japan	Heavy forklift	15 t (33,100 lb)	–	Used by the Army General Material Support Unit.
Manitou MZ50.4		France	Forklift	5 t (11,000 lb)	–	Used by the Enginnering Regiments.
Manitou ME420		France	Forklift	2 t (4,400 lb)	–	Used by Transports Regiment.

Note: additional systems not mentioned here are being used in the Portuguese Air Force.

== Engineering vehicles and equipment ==
=== Armoured engineering vehicles ===
Model	Image	Origin	Type	Quantity	Notes
Bridging equipment
M60A1 AVLB		United States	AVLB; Armoured vehicle-launched bridge	4	4 have been in service since 1961. They are operated by Engineer Company, (Companhia de Engenharia Combate Pesado or CEngCombPes).
Repair and recovery vehicles
M88A1		United States	ARV; Armoured recovery vehicle	6	The systems have been in service since 1978.
M88A2G		United States	ARV; Armoured recovery vehicle	2	The systems have been in service since 1978.
M578		United States	Light ARV; Armoured recovery vehicle	22	21 received in 1995 and 8 received in 1997. Seven M578 retired from service in January 2020 (demilitarised and scrapped).
Pandur II RV; Recovery vehicle		Austria; Portugal (licence)	Wheeled ARV; Armoured recovery vehicle	7	Equipment: 1 × FN MAG pintle-mounted machine gun; 8 × smoke grenades (76mm); 1 × knuckle boom crane Palfinger PK 8501-K

=== Unarmoured engineering equipment ===
==== Military equipment ====
Model	Image	Origin	Type	Quantity	Notes
Bridging systems
GDELS Ribbon Bridge		Germany	Pontoon bridge	–	These bridging systems are equipped with a barge, and are transported by a MAN KAT1 6×6.
Schottel M Boot Gross		Germany	Engineering boat	–	Used by the Bridge Company of the Engineering Regiment Nº1 to move the GDELS Ribbon bridge.
Bailey M2 DS		United Kingdom	Temporary modular truss bridge	–	
14.5-meter Treadway bridge	–	Treadway bridge	Temporary beam bridge	–	
Repair and recovery vehicles
Volvo FMX 380	(Illustration)	Sweden; Portugal (local modification)	4×4 tow truck	3	Light tow truck equipped with a capacity to tow a 22.0 t (48,500 lb) vehicle. It is also equipped with a Palfinger PK14.501 SLD5 knuckle boom crane with a 3.0 t (6,600 lb) lifting capacity. An additional unit ordered in September 2026. Locally modified by Sabino.
M816 Wrecker		United States	6×6 recovery truck	14	Heavy crane truck with a revolving hydraulic crane with a maximum lift capacity of 9.7t (20,000 lb). It is primarily used for vehicle recovery.
CBRN equipment
SIBCRA	(illustration)	Portugal	CBRN decontamination container	2	Based on a hooklift container, it can be transported by any truck equipped with a hydraulic hooklift hoist of the army. Developed and built in Portugal by Jacinto Defense.
SpiR-ID	(illustration)	United States	Radioactivity portable research and detection sensor	–	Used for inspections by the Nuclear, Biological, Chemical and Radiological Defense Company.
Bertin Environics ChemProX	(illustration)	France	Chemical portable research and detection sensor	2	Used for inspections by the Nuclear, Biological, Chemical and Radiological Defense Company.
Explosive ordnance disposal
Telerob tEODor		Germany	Bomb disposal robot	–	Used for inspection and Counter-IED missions.
Scopex Avenger 2.0	(illustration)	France	Bomb disposal robot	-	Used for inspection and Counter-IED missions.
Nexter NERVA-XX		France	Bomb disposal robot (wheeled or tracked)	–	Used for inspection and C-IED missions. Equipped with a Ptz camera.
Qinetiq Dragon Runner 20		United Kingdom	Bomb disposal robot	–	System used to provide safety and support to small dismounted operations for reconnaissance, security, inspection and C-IED missions.

=== Construction machines ===
Model	Image	Origin	Type	Quantity	Notes
Mobile cranes
Grove AT400		Germany	4×4 all-terrain mobile crane	–	Lifting capacity: 20 t (44,100 lb)
Tractors
John Deere 5R		United States; Portugal (local modification)	Forestry tractor	–	Modifications made by AFN Agro. Used in firefighting missions, and fire prevention.
Bulldozers
Komatsu D65EX-18		Japan	Bulldozer	–	Used by the Heavy Combat Engineering Company of the Mechanised Brigade and by the Enginnering Regiments.
Caterpillar D6H		United States	Bulldozer	–	Used by the Heavy Combat Engineering Company of the Mechanised Brigade and by the Enginnering Regiments.
Caterpillar D5		United States	Forestry bulldozer	–	Used by the Engineering Regiments.
Excavators
Komatsu PC350 NLC		Japan	35 tons tracked excavator	–	Used by the Engineering Regiments.
Volvo EC 220E		Sweden	22 tons tracked excavator	–	Used by the Third Engineering Regiment.
Hitachi 22U	(Illustration)	Japan	2.5 tons tracked excavator	–	Used by the First Engineering Regiment.
KATO HD27		Japan	2.7 tons tracked excavator	–	Used by the Engineering Regiments.
JCB 110W		United Kingdom	13.5 tons tracked excavator	–	Used by the Third Engineering Regiment.
Backhoe loaders
Komatsu WB 93R		Japan	Backhoe loader	–	Used by the Engineering Regiments.
Hidromek K4 102B	(Illustration)	Turkey	Backhoe loader	–	Used by the Engineering Regiments.
MST	(Illustration)	Turkey	Backhoe loader	2	Used by the Engineering Regiments.
JCB 3 CX		United Kingdom	Backhoe loader	–	Used by the Engineering Regiments.
JCB 1 CX		United Kingdom	Backhoe loader	–	Used by the Third Engineering Regiment.
Loaders
Caterpillar 938G		United States	Wheel loader	–	Used by the Heavy Combat Engineering Company of the Mechanised Brigade
Volvo 4400		Sweden	Wheel loader	–	Used by the Engineering Regiments.
Volvo L90D		Sweden	Wheel loader	–	Used by the Engineering Regiments.
Volvo L90H		Sweden	Wheel loader	–	Used by the Engineering Regiments.
Roller
Hamm 3000		Germany	Road roller	–	Used by the Engineering Regiments.
Dump trucks
Volvo A25G		Sweden	Articulated hauler	–	Used by the Engineering Regiments.
Graders
Volvo Champion G710/G720		Sweden	Grader	–	Used by the Engineering Regiments.
Caterpillar 120	(Illustration)	United States	Grader	–	Used by the Engineering Regiments.

=== Support equipment ===
Model	Image	Origin	Type	Quantity	Notes
Food
Kärcher MFK 2/96	(illustration)	Germany	Tactical field kitchen (trailer)	–	Capacity to serve 250 meals and 450 frozen meals.
SERT CR 500L	(illustration)	France	Tactical field kitchen (trailer)	–	
PCM 300	(illustration)	Spain	Field bakery (trailer)	–	Capacity of 1,200 kg (2,600 lb) of bread per day.
ARPA	(illustration)	Spain	Field bakery (container)	–	Capacity of 4,000 of producing breads per day.
Hygiene
RD 3000	(illustration)	France	Field bathroom	–	8 people showering simultaneously, 80 per hour.
Maintenance
L.E.M. S.r.l.	(illustration)	Italy	Mobile workshop (container)	–	The containerized workshop is transported by hooklift trucks and is equipped with various tools, workbenches, lathes, a crane and an generator.
Medical
Zeppelin Mobile Systeme - Hospital	(illustration)	Germany	Containerised field hospital	1 field hospital	The Portuguese Army, through its medical unit, possesses a deployable containerised hospital that also includes tents and generators. It is equipped with oxygen-generation capabilities and features areas for triage, surgery, decontamination, recovery, a pharmacy and wards.
Volkswagen Crafter	(illustration)	Germany; Portugal (Modified by Auto Ribeiro)	Ambulance	3	The Portuguese Army possesses Volkswagen Crafter non-tactical ambulances for patient transport since 2010. They belong to the Logistics Command and typically serve the Armed Forces Hospital.
Mercedes-Benz Sprinter W903		Germany; Portugal (Modified by Auto Ribeiro)	Ambulance	–	Received by the Army in the beginning of the 2000s and belong to the Personnel Command (CPes).
Miscellaneous
EFAFLU - Bombas e Ventiladores		Portugal	Electric generator	–	The army uses a wide range of electricity generators manufactured by EFAFLU - Bombas e Ventiladores. The power ratings used include the following: 25kVA; 50kVA; 60kVA; 100kVA; 125kVA; 150kVA; 200kVA; 250kVA; 400kVA.
–		–	Water purification container	4	The army received in 2026, 4 water tank containers with a 6 m^{3} (7.8 yd^{3})-capacity, with a reverse osmosis purification system.

== Communications / command and control ==
Model	Image	Origin	Type	Role	Notes
Command and control
BMS-C2; Battlefield Management System - Command and Control	–	Portugal	Battlefield management system	C2	System developed through a consortium including: Critical Software; Army; Navy; National Maritime Authority; INESC-ID Lisbon; Ministry of National Defence; Equipment using the system: Leopard 2A6; Pandur II; URO Vamtac
Communication systems
SIC-T; Tactical Information and Communications System	–	Portugal	Tactical communication system	Tactical network centric operation	The system includes the modules: Traffic node (NT); Access node (NA); Radio access point (PAR); Rear link (RL); Battalion command center (CCB); Company communication center (CCC); Brigade general staff (EMBrig); Battalion general staff (EMBat)
4G/5G Tactical Mobile Network	–	Portugal	Cellular network	Mobile communication system	Developed in 2026 in partnership with MEO and Jacinto Defense to respond to natural disasters in areas where the mobile network is not operational.
Starlink		United States	Phased-array antenna	Internet satellite access	≥ 54 portable antennas
Radio
EID TWH-104R4	–	Portugal	Land personal radio	Infantry radio	
EID PRC-525	–	Portugal	Multi-band software defined radio (HF, VHF, UHF)	Combat net-radio, Tactical voice and data network, packet radio, radio access point	The communications are encrypted (COMSEC) and it is doing frequency hopping (TRANSEC). Delivered from 2019 to 2026.
Rohde & Schwarz Soveron HR5000	–	Germany; Portugal	Handheld software defined radio	Dismounted communications system	Selected in October 2022 as part of the Dismounted Soldier Communications System programme, in collaboration with EID. The HR system is used by the dismounted soldiers, the VR system is the vehicular radio.
Rohde & Schwarz Soveron VR5000	–	Germany; Portugal	Vehicular software defined radio	Communication system from the vehicle to the dismount	Selected in October 2022 as part of the Dismounted Soldier Communications System programme, in collaboration with EID. The HR system is used by the dismounted soldiers, the VR system is the vehicular radio.
Thales AN/PRC-148 JEM		France; United States	Handheld multi-band software defined radio (VHF)	JTRS Enhanced Multiband Inter/Intra Team Radio	Used by the special forces (CTOE).
Intercom
EID ICC-201	–	Portugal	Tactical intercom	C4ISR use	
EID ICC-251	–	Portugal	Tactical intercom	C4ISR use	
EID ICC-401 IP	–	Portugal	Tactical intercom	C4ISR use	It was ordered in 2020. It is NGVA and STANAG 4754 compatible.
Automatic Weather Station
Marwin BW12	–	Finland	Automatic Weather Station	–	Used to predict the direction, speed, and range of an artillery projectile through air density, air temperature and humidity.

== Air defence systems ==
Model	Image	Origin	Type	Range / altitude	Quantity	Notes
Command and control
SICCA3; Sistema Integrado de Comando e Controlo para a Artilharia Antiaérea	–	Portugal	Anti-aircraft artillery battlefield management system	–	–	It is a specialised command and control (C2) system that allows the management, integration, and coordination of the anti-aircraft artillery capabilities and units of the Land Forces, especially within the scope of joint and integrated air defense.
Air surveillance
AN/PPQ-2 PSTAR; Portable Search and Target Acquisition Radar	(Illustration)	United States	Portable target acquisition radar	–	–	Data transmitted to a command post by a PRC525A tactical radio.
Thales Ground Master 200		France	S band (IEEE), 3D, AESA, air surveillance radar	250 km (155.3 mi)	1 + 1 on order	System ordered in October 2024. 1 radar is used per battery. Purchased with the RapidRanger, supporting their operations by feeding the data to the missile launchers.
Air defence launcher
FIM-92 Stinger		United States	MANPADS	8 km (5.0 mi) / 3,800 m (12,500 ft)	40 (launchers)	40 in use since 1994, in use with: the First Anti-Aircraft Artillery Regiment; the Anti-Aircraft Artillery Battery; the Paratroopers; Upgrades: New Aselsan Mini-TWS-S sights and missiles were acquired in 2021.; MODE 5 Friend or Foe identification systems were acquired starting in 2024.
URO Vamtac ST5 BN3 / Thales RapidRanger		France; Spain	SHORAD system	7 km (4.3 mi) / 6 km (3.7 mi)	2 batteries (4 launchers)	2 batteries with 4 launch vehicles were received in Novmber 2026. Equipment: Thales UK RapidRanger weapon station; Thales UK ForceShield command and control system and communication system with the data acquisition radar; Effectors: Starstreak (7 km (4.3 mi) range); LMM / Martlet (6 km (3.7 mi) range)
Air defence guns
Rheinmetall Mk 20 Rh-202		Germany	20 mm anti-aircraft twin gun	1,600 m (5,200 ft)	36	In service since 1981. Some could be used for coastal defence in Azores and Madeira islands.
Anti-drone electronic warfare
Swatter Portable Gun	(Illustration)	Portugal	Anti-drone jammer	–	–	It resulted from the LPM 2023-2024 (Military Programming Law) expressed need to acquire anti-drone systems.

== Aircraft ==
Model	Variant	Image	Origin	Type	Quantity	Notes
Sikorsky UH-60 Black Hawk	UH-60L		United States	Combat helicopter	1 + 3 on order	The Army Light Aviation Unit received its first UH-60 Black Hawk helicopter in October, 2026. The equipment received with the helicopters include: Support to ground troops with the following weapons: Door mounted weapons; 6 × FN M3M machine guns; 2 × M240 machine guns; EGMS kit with: 2 × 70mm rocket pods; MEDEVAC equipment with SAR capabilities and a FLIR system; Wildfire suppression

== Unmanned vehicles ==
=== Unmanned ground vehicles ===
Model	Image	Origin	Type	Role	Quantity	Notes
Jupiterdynamic UGV	–	Portugal	Remote-control vehicle	–	1	An unmanned ground vehicle, weighing over 750 kg and remotely controlled, was acquired from Jupiterdynamic in November 2026.
Modular X	–	Portugal	Remote-control vehicle	Cargo transport and MEDIVAC	1	The Modular X was developed and supplied by INESC TEC and Tribe Lab, it can operate on tracks or wheels, depending on the terrain and the mission, and has a load capacity of up to 500 kg.
VIGILANT	–	Portugal	Remote-control vehicle	Surveillance and Reconnaissance	1	The Vigilant is an unmanned ground system developed through a partnership between the Portuguese Army and the Instituto Superior Técnico. The project focuses on autonomous surveillance, reconnaissance, and light logistical support in a military environment.
Unitree Robotics Go2		China	Quadruped robotic dog	Command and control	–	It includes a Nomad Shield tactical module integrated into the robot’s back that functions as a portable station for sensors, communications, and electronic protection.

=== Unmanned aereal vehicles ===
Model	Image	Origin	Type	Role	Quantity	Notes
Loitering munition
UVision HERO-30		Israel; Italy (licence)	Canister-launched, deploying cruciform wing, mini-UAV	Loitering munition	–	Received in 2026 and used for the first time during the Strong Impact 2026 exercise, an exercise that brings together various artillery units of the Portuguese Army, along with NATO allies at the Santa Margarida military camp.
Armed drones
GEPRC Vapor	(Illustration)	China; Portugal (modifications)	Multicopter, mini-UAV; Unmanned aerial vehicle	FPV suicide drone	–	Commercial drones modified by the Portuguese Army to receive a warhead.
Military surveillance / reconnaissance drones
AeroVironment RQ-11 Raven		United States	Fixed-wing mini-UAV; Unmanned aerial vehicle	ISTAR; Intelligence, surveillance, target acquisition and reconnaissance	12 systems 36 aircraft	36 aircraft or twelve systems (together with associated services and equipment) were purchased through the NSPA on 20 August 2018.
Skydio X10D		United States	Multicopter, mini-UAV; Unmanned aerial vehicle	ISR; Intelligence, surveillance and reconnaissance	40	In 2024, the Army launched a tender through the NSPA for the purchase of 40 Class 1 unmanned aerial vehicles.. The Portuguese Army began receiving its first units of the Skydio X10D unmanned aerial system in 2026.
Parrot ANAFI		France	Multicopter, mini-UAV; Unmanned aerial vehicle	ISR; Intelligence, surveillance and reconnaissance	–	Used by Special Operations Troops Centre.
STRIKE 1.0	(Illustration)	Portugal	Multicopter, mini-UAV; Unmanned aerial vehicle	ISR; Intelligence, surveillance and reconnaissance	–	Produced by the Portuguese Army, through its General Army Materiel Support Unit (UAGME), using 3D printers.
ADS - Fura-bardos	(Illustration)	Portugal	Multicopter, mini-UAV; Unmanned aerial vehicle	ISR; Intelligence, surveillance and reconnaissance	30	Acquired in 2026 for a sum of €133,650.00 to equip the Infantry Battalions of the Madeira and Azores Military Zones.
ADS - Açor	(Illustration)	Portugal	Multicopter, mini-UAV; Unmanned aerial vehicle	ISR; Intelligence, surveillance and reconnaissance	9	Acquired in 2026 for a sum of €133,650.00 to equip the Infantry Battalions of the Madeira and Azores Military Zones.
Commercial surveillance / reconnaissance drones
MyFlyDream Nimbus Tricopter 1800	–	China	VTOL, fixed-wing mini-UAV; Unmanned aerial vehicle	ISR; Intelligence, surveillance and reconnaissance	12	Received in 2021, used by the First Anti-aircraft Artillery Regiment and the 5th Artillery Regiment.
Autel DragonFish	–	China	Fixed-wing UAV; Unmanned aerial vehicle	ISR; Intelligence, surveillance and reconnaissance	–	Used with the Intervention Brigade.
Beyond Vision HEIFU	(Illustration)	Portugal	Multicopter, mini-UAV; Unmanned aerial vehicle	ISR; Intelligence, surveillance and reconnaissance	–	
Autel EVO II Dual 640T Enterprise V2		China	Multicopter, mini-UAV; Unmanned aerial vehicle	ISR; Intelligence, surveillance and reconnaissance	–	
DJI Matrice 300 RTK		China	Multicopter, mini-UAV; Unmanned aerial vehicle	ISR; Intelligence, surveillance and reconnaissance	–	Used by the Intervention Brigade, the Azores Military Command and the Madeira Military Operational Command for surveillance.
DJI Mavic Pro		China	Multicopter, mini-UAV; Unmanned aerial vehicle	ISR; Intelligence, surveillance and reconnaissance	–	Seen in use by Portuguese Paratroopers and Madeira Military Operational Command. Number of units purchased unknown.
DJI Avata 2		China	Multicopter, mini-UAV; Unmanned aerial vehicle	ISR; Intelligence, surveillance and reconnaissance	–	Seen in use by a Portuguese soldier from Infantry Regiment No. 14 during his deployment to Romania.
iFlight ProTek35	(Illustration)	China	Multicopter, mcroi-UAV; Unmanned aerial vehicle	ISR; Intelligence, surveillance and reconnaissance	–	Seen in use with the Third Garrison Regiment.
Testing drones
UAVision ELANUS	(Illustration)	Portugal	Fixed-wing mini-UAV; Unmanned aerial vehicle	Loitering munition	–	Being used on trial in 2025 by the by CEMTEx (Army Technological Experimentation). Characteristics: Range: 50 km (31.1 mi); Flight endurance: 30 minutes; Payload capacity: 3 kg (6.6 lb) warhead; Launch: tube launched
Beyond Vision BVQ407	(Illustration)	Portugal	Multicopter, mini-UAV; Unmanned aerial vehicle	ISR; Intelligence, surveillance and reconnaissance	1	Being used on trial in 2025 by the by CEMTEx (Army Technological Experimentation). Characteristics: Payload capacity: 1 kg (2.2 lb) warhead
Beyond Vision BVQ418	(Illustration)	Portugal	Multicopter, mini-UAV; Unmanned aerial vehicle	FPV suicide drone	1	Being used on trial / research by the by CEMTEx (Army Technological Experimentation).
Raven (MOTUS Robotics / FEUP)	–	Portugal	Multicopter, mini-UAV; Unmanned aerial vehicle	ISR; Intelligence, surveillance and reconnaissance	1	Being used on trial / research by the by CEMTEx (Army Technological Experimentation).
Miscellaneous drone
Griffon Aerospace MQM-170 Outlaw		United States	Fixed-wing UAV; Unmanned aerial vehicle	Target drone	–	Operated by the First Anti-aircraft Artillery Regiment.
ADS - Garajau	–	Portugal	Multicopter, mini-UAV; Unmanned aerial vehicle	Training drone	6	Acquired in 2026 to train future drone operators for the military zones of Madeira and the Azores.
SenseFly eBee X	–	Switzerland	Fixed-wing UAV; Unmanned aerial vehicle	Mapping drone	1	Used by the Army Geospatial Information Center.
DJI FlyCart 30		China	Multicopter, UAV; Unmanned aerial vehicle	Cargo transport	–	Used by the Military Unit Laboratory of Biological and Chemical Defense.
DJI Agras T50		China	Multicopter, UAV; Unmanned aerial vehicle	Pulveriser	–	Used by the Military Unit Laboratory of Biological and Chemical Defense.

== Watercraft ==
Model	Image	Origin	Type	Quantity	Notes
Mercury 500	(Illustration)	United States	Reconnaissance and infiltration inflatable boat	–	Known to be used by the following army units: 6th Cavalry Regiment; 1st Engineer Regiment; Paratroopers; CTOE - Centro de Tropas de Operações Especiais (Special operations troops centre)
VANGUARD Marine	(Illustration)	Portugal	Reconnaissance and infiltration inflatable boat	4	4 boats and 2 trailers acquired from Vanguard Marine in 2026.

== Future equipment ==
=== Orders ===
==== Air defence ====
Model	Image	Origin	Type	Range	Quantity	Notes
Air surveillance
Thales Ground Master 200		France	S band (IEEE), 3D, AESA, air surveillance radar	250 km (155.3 mi)	1	System ordered in October 2024. 1 radar is used per battery. Purchased with the RapidRanger, supporting their operations by feeding the data to the missile launchers.

==== Aircraft ====
Model	Variant	Image	Origin	Type	Quantity	Notes
Sikorsky UH-60 Black Hawk	UH-60L or more recent		United States	Combat helicopter	3	The Ministry of National Defence is planning to revive the Army Light Aviation Unit which was deactivated in July 2015. A contract was signed in Jully 2026. A tender was launched in 2025 to order 3 to 4 helicopters, not necessarily new, and in the UH-60L variant or more recent. The equipment planned to go with the helicopters include: Support to ground troops with the following weapons: Door mounted weapons; 6 × FN M3M machine guns; 2 × M240 machine guns; EGMS kit with: 2 × 70mm rocket pods; MEDEVAC equipment with SAR capabilities and a FLIR system; Wildfire suppression

=== Planned orders ===
List of equipment that Portugal plans to invest in, some of which are mentioned in the Portuguese Military Programming Law:

==== Infantry weapons ====
Model	Variant	Image	Origin	Type	Calibre	Notes
Anti-tank weapons
EuroSpike	Spike LR2		Israel; Germany (licence)	Anti-tank guided missile	130mm	Selected at the end of 2025 to succeed to the MILAN missile system. Order expected early in 2026. Some Spike ATGM will be installed on Pandur II 8×8.

==== Indirect fire ====
Model	Image	Origin	Type	Calibre	Quantity	Notes
Mortars
–	(Illustration)	–	Mortar	–	–	In 2023, Portugal was planning to purchase infantry mortars for the troops carried by the Pandur II.
URO Vamtac ST5 mortar carrier	(Illustration)	Spain	Armoured mortar carrier,	120 mm	12	Planned purchase as part of the Land Force 2045 objective. A tender process was launched by Portugal through the NSPA for the acquisition of 12 × 120 mm mortar carriers based on the URO Vamtac ST5 in 2024.
Artillery
CaESAr MK 2		France	Self-propelled howitzer	155 mm, L/52	36	Framework agreement signed in October 2024 for the purchase of 36 systems. Portugal confirmed its commitment in February 2025 during a presidential visit in France. The planned delivery is for 2029 - 2030.

==== Vehicles ====
Model	Image	Origin	Type	Quantity	Notes
Armoured fighting vehicles
ARTEC Boxer		Germany; Netherlands; Portugal (licence)	8×8 APC; Armoured personnel carrier	90	The Army is planning to replace the M113 APC with the Boxer. The purchase would be supported by the SAFE financing mechanism of the European Union. The Minister of Defense, Nuno Melo, admitted that these vehicles will be assembled in Portugal.
URO Vamtac ST5 BN3		Spain	IMV; Infantry mobility vehicle	–	The intended JLTV purchase was cancelled in April 2020. The need still exists, and the Amy is planning to purchase new vehicles. It was reported in 2026 that Portugal and Spain, through the SAFE program, will make a joint purchase of Uro Vamtac vehicles.
Utility
–		–	4×4 tactical truck	–	The Portuguese Army was authorised by the Ministry of Defense in 2024 to acquire Medium Tactical Vehicles to operate in Army Regiments on the islands of the Azores and Madeira.
–		–	6x6 tactical truck with hook-lift system	14	The Council of Ministers has authorized the Army to acquire 14 tactical vehicles for the transport of water and fuel storage units, field kitchens, and other equipment to support military operations and disaster response. The vehicles (HOOK-LIFT 6x6) will be procured through the NATO Support and Procurement Agency for approximately 6 million euros.
–		–	6×6 truck	1	The Portuguese Army was authorised by the Ministry of Defense in 2024 to acquire one 6x6 tank truck for water transport.
–		–	Semi truck	Up to 3 (40-ton capacity)	The Ministry of National Defence authorised the Army, in May 2026, to spend up to a maximum total of two million two hundred and seven thousand euros for the acquisition of up to 13 vehicles in total: Up to two "Sideloader" container carriers (3 acquired in September 2026), Up to three 40-ton tractor-trucks (1 acquired in September 2026), Up to two 40-ton container semi-trailers, Up to two 85-ton tractor-trucks, Up to four 70-ton semi-trailers.
–		–	Semi truck	Up to 2 (85-ton capacity)	The Ministry of National Defence authorised the Army, in May 2026, to spend up to a maximum total of two million two hundred and seven thousand euros for the acquisition of up to 13 vehicles in total: Up to two "Sideloader" container carriers (3 acquired in September 2026), Up to three 40-ton tractor-trucks (1 acquired in September 2026), Up to two 40-ton container semi-trailers, Up to two 85-ton tractor-trucks, Up to four 70-ton semi-trailers.
–		–	Flatbed semi-trailer	Up to 2 (40-ton container)	The Ministry of National Defence authorised the Army, in May 2026, to spend up to a maximum total of two million two hundred and seven thousand euros for the acquisition of up to 13 vehicles in total: Up to two "Sideloader" container carriers (3 acquired in September 2026), Up to three 40-ton tractor-trucks (1 acquired in September 2026), Up to two 40-ton container semi-trailers, Up to two 85-ton tractor-trucks, Up to four 70-ton semi-trailers.
–		–	Semi-trailer	Up to 4 (70-ton capacity)	The Ministry of National Defence authorised the Army, in May 2026, to spend up to a maximum total of two million two hundred and seven thousand euros for the acquisition of up to 13 vehicles in total: Up to two "Sideloader" container carriers (3 acquired in September 2026), Up to three 40-ton tractor-trucks (1 acquired in September 2026), Up to two 40-ton container semi-trailers, Up to two 85-ton tractor-trucks, Up to four 70-ton semi-trailers.
–		–	4×2 cargo truck	2	A tender has been launched for the acquisition of 186 vehicles for the Army, including the purchase of two equipment transport trucks, one heavy 4x4 truck for engineering support, one heavy 6x6 truck for engineering support, and tractor trucks for engineering support.
–		–	4×4 transport truck	1	A tender has been launched for the acquisition of 186 vehicles for the Army, including the purchase of two equipment transport trucks, one heavy 4x4 truck for engineering support, one heavy 6x6 truck for engineering support, and tractor trucks for engineering support.
–		–	6×6 transport truck	1	A tender has been launched for the acquisition of 186 vehicles for the Army, including the purchase of two equipment transport trucks, one heavy 4x4 truck for engineering support, one heavy 6x6 truck for engineering support, and tractor trucks for engineering support.
–		–	Heavy cargo truck	1	A tender has been launched for the acquisition of 186 vehicles for the Army, including the purchase of two equipment transport trucks, one heavy 4x4 truck for engineering support, one heavy 6x6 truck for engineering support, and tractor trucks for engineering support.
–		–	Bus up to 22 seats	15	A tender has been launched for the acquisition of 186 vehicles for the Army, including the purchase of 15 buses with a 22-person capacity, 11 buses with a capacity of 23 to 30 people, and 10 buses with a 41-person capacity.
–		–	Bus of 23 to 30 seats	11	A tender has been launched for the acquisition of 186 vehicles for the Army, including the purchase of 15 buses with a 22-person capacity, 11 buses with a capacity of 23 to 30 people, and 10 buses with a 41-person capacity.
–		–	Bus with more than 41 seats	10	A tender has been launched for the acquisition of 186 vehicles for the Army, including the purchase of 15 buses with a 22-person capacity, 11 buses with a capacity of 23 to 30 people, and 10 buses with a 41-person capacity.
–		–	Van	12	A tender has been launched for the acquisition of 186 vehicles for the Army, including the purchase of 10 vans for food transport and 2 vans for horses transport.
–		–	Passenger van	27	A tender has been launched for the acquisition of 186 vehicles for the Army, including the purchase of 27 light passenger vans with a capacity of more than six people. This contract is divided into three lots.
–		–	Passenger Van with 5 seats	25	A tender has been launched for the acquisition of 186 vehicles for the Army, including the purchase of 25 light five-seater vans.
–		–	All-terrain ambulance	24	The Army was authorised in March 2026 to incur expenditure, up to a maximum total amount of EUR 2,832,000.00, for the acquisition of type B all-terrain ambulances.
–		–	Pickup truck	45	A tender has been launched for the acquisition of 186 vehicles for the Army, including the purchase of 45 all wheel drive pickup trucks.
–		–	4×4 all-terrain vehicle	43	The Army is planning to receive 43 light allterrain vehicles to equip some of its Rapid Reaction Brigade units.
–		–	Motorcycle	12	A tender has been launched for the acquisition of 186 vehicles for the Army, including the purchase of 12 motorcycles with engine displacements between 501cc and 750cc.
STRiX	(Illustration)	Slovenia	Electric motorcycle	–	The Portuguese army, through its commando unit, is testing STRiX electric tactical motorcycles for reconnaissance missions.

==== Engineering equipment ====
Model	Image	Origin	Type	Quantity	Notes
Bridging equipment
Panzerschnellbrücke Leguan		Germany	AVLB; Armoured vehicle-launched bridge	2	The purchase of AVLB in support of the Leopard 2 mechanised units was authorised in November 2024.
Repair and recovery vehicles
BPz3 Büffel, or WiSENT 2	(BPz 3) (WiSENT 2)	Germany	ARV; Armoured recovery vehicle	2	The purchase of ARV in support of the Leopard 2 mechanised units was authorised in November 2024.
CBRN
URO Vamtac ST5 - Pitón	(Illustration)	Spain	Light 4×4 CBRN reconnaissance vehicle Chemical, biological, radiological, and nuclear defence	–	Authorised in 2024 to acquire vehicles for the CBRN role.
Demining equipment
MineWolf Systems		Switzerland	Military mine flail robot	2	The Army reported in its newspaper that intends to acquire two minewolf demining vehicles.
URO Vamtac ST5 - EOD	(Illustration)	Spain	Light 4×4 EOD; Explosive ordnance disposal	–	Authorised in 2024 to acquire vehicles for the EOD role.

==== Support equipment ====
Model	Image	Origin	Type	Quantity	Notes
Medical equipment
Role 2B field hospital	(Illustration)	–	Field hospital	1	
Refuelling
Inflatable diesel tank	(Illustration)		Fuel field storage tank	6	Planned purchase of inflatable tank to store fuel for the army.
Enginnering
Military Bridge	(Illustration)	–	Floating bridge	–	The Portuguese Army wants to acquire new bridge systems for its engineering units.[

==== Electronic equipment ====
Model	Image	Origin	Type	Quantity	Notes
Surveillance equipment
Ground surveillance radar	(Illustration)	–	Ground surveillance radar	2	Tender launched in November 2024, for replies from suppliers in December 2025 for 2 radars.

==== Air defence ====
Model	Image	Origin	Type	Range / Altitude	Quantity	Notes
Surface-to-air missile systems
–	(Illustration)	European Union	Short range air defence system	–	2 fire units	In October 2024, the chief of staff of the army announced to include medium-range air defence systems in the military programming law. Portugal joined the ESSI in February 2025. In October 2025, Portugal announced its plan to invest in short and medium range air defence systems. Potential systems: IRIS-T SLS; IRIS-T SLM (as part of the ESSI); IRIS-T SLX; CAMM-ER; MICA NG VL; NOMADS GBADS; NASAMS 3; Note: if longer range, the SAMP/T NG or the Patriot PAC-3 systems might be considered.
–	(Illustration)	European Union	Medium range air defence system	80 km (49.7 mi) / 40 km (24.9 mi)	1 fire unit	In October 2024, the chief of staff of the army announced to include medium-range air defence systems in the military programming law. Portugal joined the ESSI in February 2025. In October 2025, Portugal announced its plan to invest in short and medium range air defence systems. Potential systems: IRIS-T SLS; IRIS-T SLM (as part of the ESSI); IRIS-T SLX; CAMM-ER; MICA NG VL; NOMADS GBADS; NASAMS 3; Note: if longer range, the SAMP/T NG or the Patriot PAC-3 systems might be considered.
C-UAS systems
Skyranger 30	(Illustration)	Switzerland; Germany	SPAAG; Self-propelled anti-aircraft gun	3 km (1.9 mi)	up to 16	It was reported on SIC Notícias that Portugal will proceed with the purchase of up to 16 systems by 2030, to be integrated into Boxer armored vehicles.

==== UAV ====
Model	Image	Origin	Type	Role	Quantity	Notes
Loitering munitions
HERO-30		Israel; Italy (licence)	Canister-launched, deploying cruciform wing, mini-UAV	Loitering munition	–	Portugal has expressed the need for loitering munitions. The HERO-30 is to be made and supplied by RWM Italia S.p:A. This system was tested by the Army in December 2025. Specifications of the system: Range: 10 km (6.2 mi); Endurance: 30 minutes; Warhead weight: 0.5 kg (1.1 lb); UAV weight: 3 kg (6.6 lb)

== Retired equipment ==
Extended content

=== War reserve ===
List of equipment that remains in the war reserves.

==== Infantry weapons ====
Pistols:

- Beretta 92 (Was used by Army Police)
- Heckler & Koch USP (Was used by Portuguese Army in some international missions)
- SIG Sauer P228 (Was used by CTOE)

Submachine guns:

- Uzi m/961: currently on the war reserves

Assault rifles and battle rifles:

- Heckler & Koch G36K/KE/C (used by Special Operations Troops Centre)
- SIG SG 543 (1.049 units used by Commandos and CTOE)
- IMI Galil ARM (2.000 units used by Portuguese Paratroopers)
- Heckler & Koch G3A3/A4 (Replaced by FN SCAR L) 1,000 G3A3/4s were sent by Portugal to Ukraine as part of a military package in response to the 2022 Russian invasion of Ukraine. The number of G3s sent was revealed in an interview with Commander Silva Pinto held during the military parade on Portugal Day. The Portuguese Marine Corps use a modernized version of the G3A3/A4 with kit Spuhr and Aimpoint CompM4 red dot sight.

Precision rifles:

- Heckler & Koch PSG1: currently on the war reserves

Machine guns:

- Heckler & Koch HK21
- M60E3 machine gun
- MG 3

Shotguns:

- Franchi SPAS 15

=== Infantry weapons ===
Pistols:

- Luger P08
- Mauser C96
- Smith & Wesson Model 10
- Walther P38

Submachine guns:

- Brügger & Thomet MP9 (used for experimental purposes during ISAF mission).
- FBP (pistola-metralhadora) m/948 (39.113 units)
- Bergmann MP 18 7.65mm
- Sterling submachine gun L2A1
- Sten SMG
- Vigneron (pistola-metralhadora) m/961

Assault rifles and battle rifles:

- ArmaLite AR-10 (1.500 units)
- FN FAL (4.795 units)
- Karabiner 98k Espingarda 8 mm Mauser m/938
- M1917 Enfield

Machine guns:

- Breda Model 37 m/938
- M1919
- Madsen machine gun
- MG 42
- Maschinengewehr Modell 34 (MG34)
- MG13 m/944
- Lewis machine gun
- Vickers machine gun

Grenade launchers:

- Heckler & Koch HK79A1
- M79 grenade launcher

Anti-tank weapons:

- Bazuca 60mm m/955
- Lança Foguetes de 37mm
- M18 recoilless rifle 57mm
- M20 "Super" Bazooka m/952
- M20 recoilless rifle 75mm
- M40A1 recoilless rifle 106mm (128 units)
- M67 recoilless rifle 90mm

=== Indirect fire ===
Self-propelled artillery:

- M125A1/A2 mortar carrier (15 units)
- M109 A2 (6 units)

Towed artillery:

- 15 cm sFH 18
- 10.5 cm leFH 18 (150 units)
- Canon de 75 modèle 1897
- BL 6-inch 26 cwt howitzer
- BL 5.5-inch medium gun (227 units)
- BL 4.5-inch medium field gun (120 units)
- M101A1/A1L howitzer (54 units)
- Obice da 75/18 modello 34 (92 units)
- Ordnance QF 25-pounder (12 relegated to ceremonial role) (132 units received)
- OTO Melara Mod 56 (24 units)

Mortars:

- Mortar 81mm French Brandt m/937
- Mortar 107mm M2 4.2-inch m/951
- Mortar M2 60mm

=== Vehicles ===
Armoured fighting vehicles:

- Alvis Saladin (39 units)
- Chaimite (80 units)
- Carden Loyd tankette (15 units)
- Cromwell Centaur (48 units)
- Daimler Dingo (200 units)
- Ferret (32 units)
- Fox Mk I (38 units)
- Humber Mk IV (48 units)
- M2 Half-track
- M3 Half-track (8 units)
- M3A1 Scout Car (32 units)
- M4A3E4 Sherman (13 units)
- M4A1 Grizzly I cruiser (57 units)
- M5A1 Stuart (96 units)
- M8 Greyhound (2 units)
- M24 Chaffee (19 units)
- M47 Patton (122 units)
- M48 Patton (86 units)
- M60A3 TTS Patton (93 units)
- Marmon-Herrington (6 units)
- Panhard AML-60 (45 units)
- Panhard EBR (50 units)
- Panhard ETT (28 units)
- Panhard M3 (6 to 8 units)
- Sexton Mk II (54 units)
- TP4 Bren Universal Carrier (178 units)
- Valentine Mk2 (36 units)
- Vickers 6-Ton (2 units)

Special forces vehicles:

- Fast Attack Vehicle (6 units used by Portuguese Paratroopers)

Engineering vehicles:

- M74 ARV (13 units)
- M728 (3 units)

=== Air defence ===
Air defence missile launchers:

- Thomson-CSF Crotale (2 launching units with 1 radar)
- M48A2E1/A3 Chaparral (11 version A2E1 and 23 version A3) with two MPQ-54 FAAR radars.

MANPADS:

- Blowpipe (57 units)

Anti-air cannons:

- Bofors 40 mm (62 units)
