= Akdal MKA 1919 =

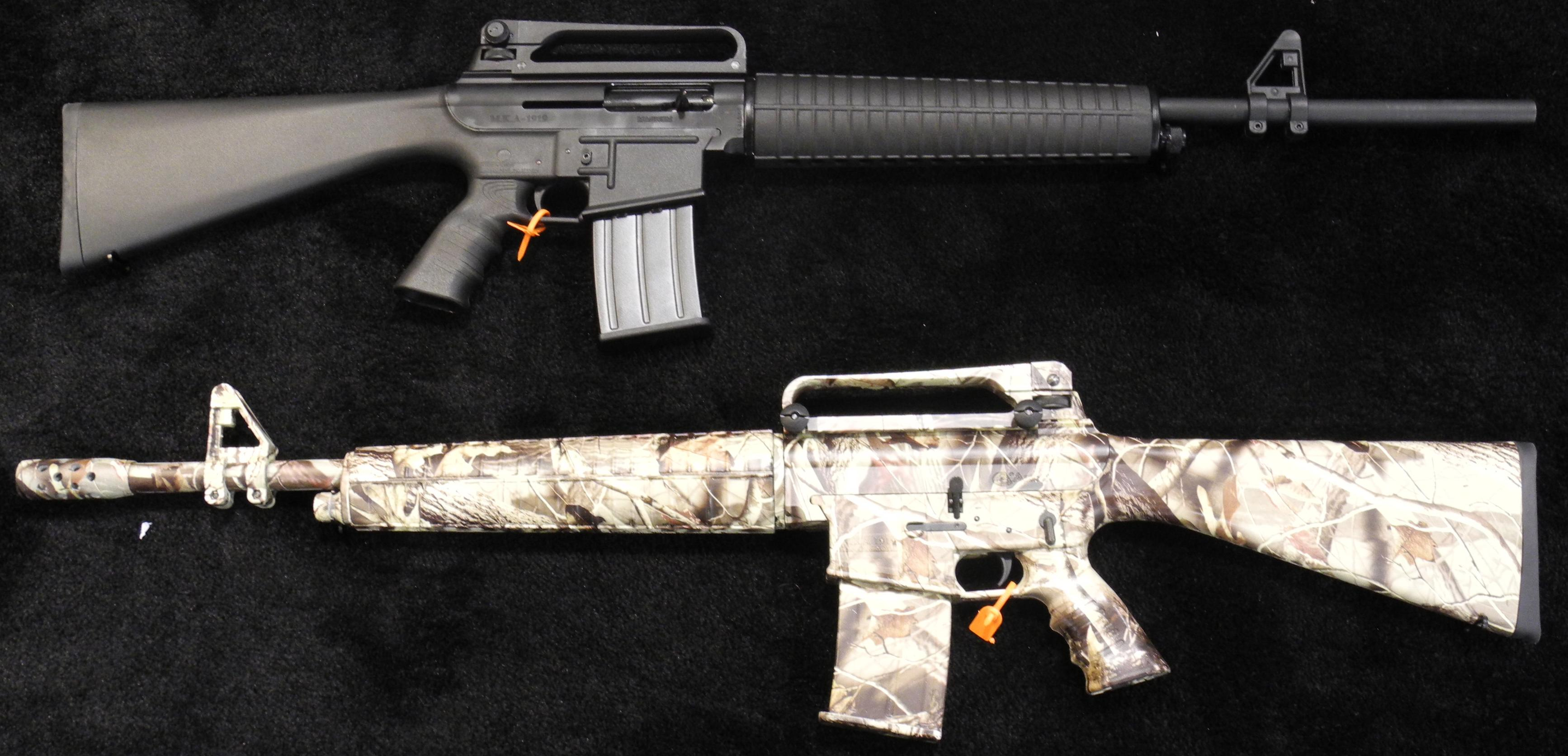
- Type: Shotgun
- Place of origin: Türkiye

Service history
- Wars: Russo-Ukrainian War

Production history
- Designer: Akdal Arms (Ucyildiz Arms A.Ş.)
- Designed: 2006
- Produced: 2007
- Variants: Civil/Military

Specifications (Akdal MKA 1919)
- Mass: 3.25 kg (7.2 lb)
- Length: 964 mm (38 in)
- Barrel length: 470 mm (19 in)
- Cartridge: 12 gauge
- Action: Gas operated, semi-automatic
- Effective firing range: 50 m (55 yd)
- Feed system: Box magazines

The Akdal MKA 1919 is a gas operated, semi-automatic shotgun that resembles the M16 rifle and mimics the layout and placement of some of the controls, created by Turkish company Akdal Arms.

== Design ==
The MKA 1919 uses a conventional gas-operated action which is located around the support tube that runs below the barrel. The return spring is also located around the same support tube which is concealed by an enlarged polymer handguard.

The MKA 1919 barrel can be quickly removed from upper receiver. To charge the rifle, the charging handle on the receiver must be pulled. The upper receiver is manufactured from an aluminum alloy while the lower receiver, along with pistol grip and shoulder stock, is manufactured as one piece from impact-resistant polymer.

The MKA 1919 has a 5-round detachable box magazine. It has a bolt release identical in location and function to the one on the M16. Manual safety also duplicates M16-style being located on the left side of the receiver above the pistol grip.

On the upper receiver, an integral Picatinny rail exists which will accept detachable carrying handle or optional red-dot or other optical sight attachments. Standard sights include a front post installed on the M16-style removable base and a detachable M16A2-style carrying handle with built-in diopter sight.

== Users ==
- Russia
- Turkey
- Ukraine

== Related firearms ==
- Benelli M3
- Franchi SPAS-15
- Heckler & Koch FABARM FP6
- Fabarm SDASS Tactical
- Safir T-14
- Saiga 12
- USAS-12
- RIA VR80
