= Mechanized Brigade (Portugal) =

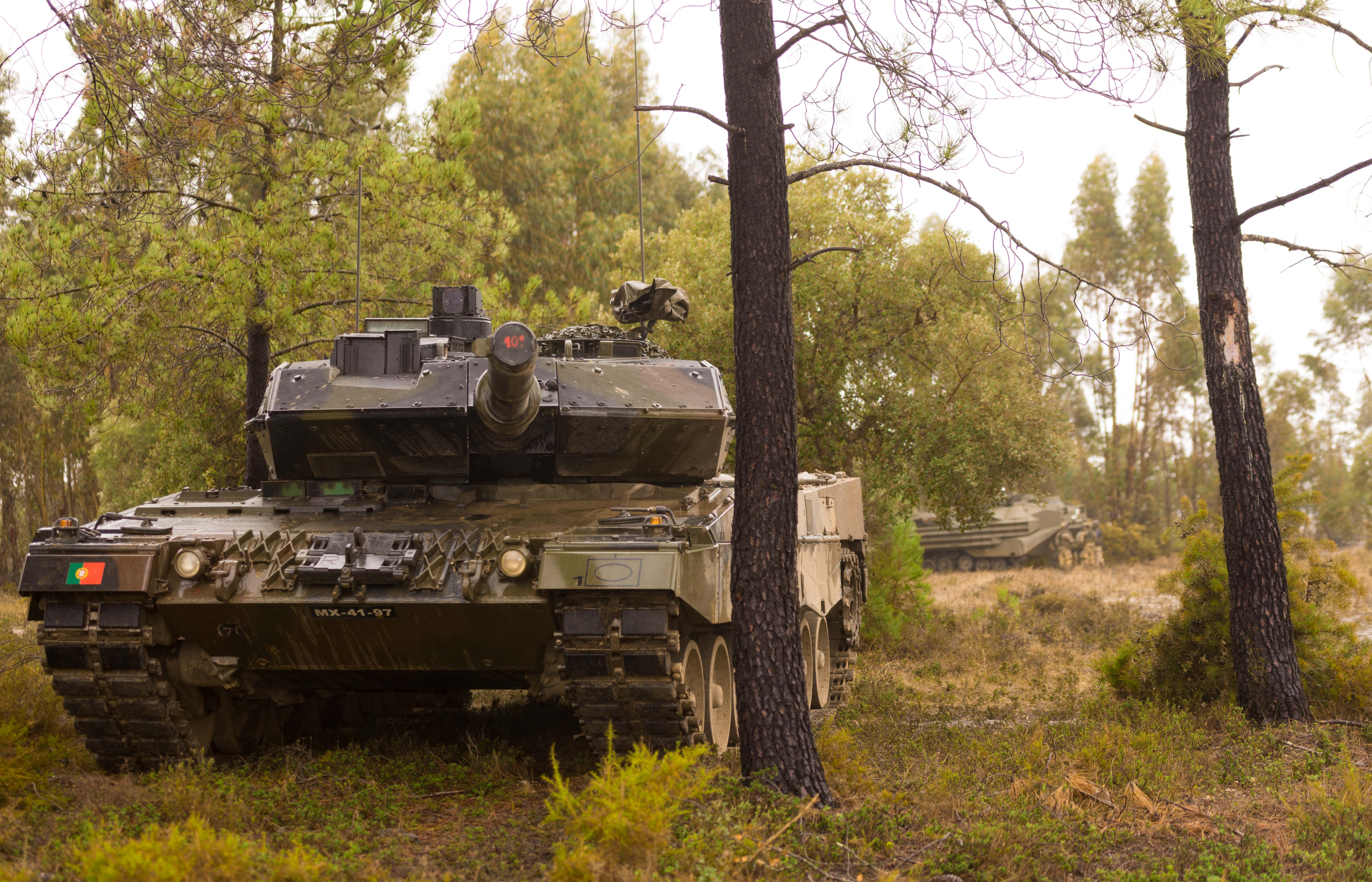
Portuguese Mechanized Brigade Leopard 2 A6 during NATO exercise Trident Juncture 15.

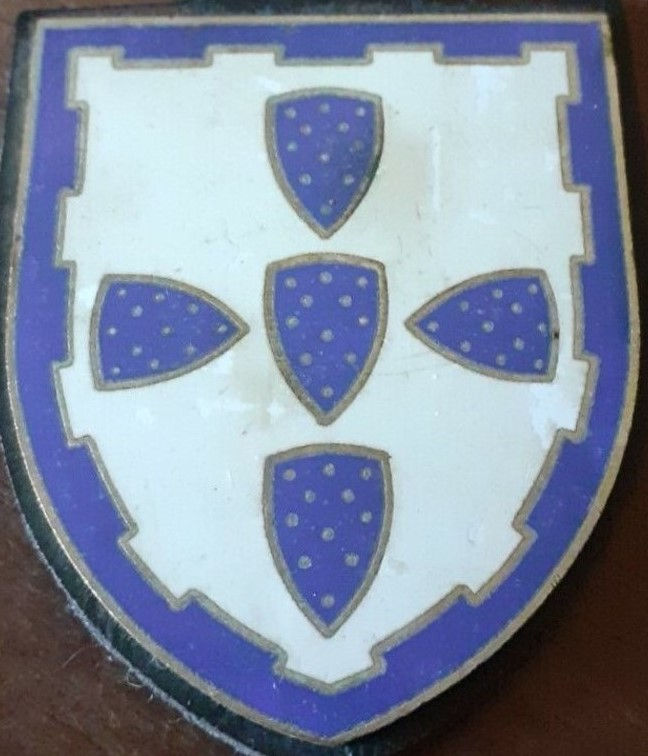
Badge of the Mechanized Brigade

The Mechanized Brigade (Portuguese: Brigada Mecanizada) or BrigMec is a mechanized infantry brigade in service with the Portuguese Army.

== History ==
The 3rd Infantry Division (3ª Divisão de Infantaria or Divisão Nun´Álvares) was created and assigned to NATO in 1953.

The Nun Alvares Division adopted an almost totally U.S. organization (and equipment), including around 20,000 men, with three infantry regiments (each reinforced with a squadron of tanks), a divisional tank battalion, three field artillery battalions and anti-aircraft, engineering, signal and logistical units. To serve as a training base for the division, the large Santa Margarida Military Camp was built. As the Nun'Álvares Division started to be mainly maintained by the 3rd Military Region (headquartered in Tomar), from 1955, it began to be officially designated as the 3rd Division.

In 1960 the "Nun Alvares" Division's organization was changed from three tactical groupings, based on infantry regiments, to three LANDCENT-type infantry brigades. In 1961 the 3rd Division organized its last large maneuvers. From 1961, the Portuguese Army's effort focused primarily on the Overseas War, with the division entering a decline.

In 1968–1976, studies were carried out to update Portugal's ground contribution to NATO for a force of different characteristics from the 3rd Division. This took form with the 1st Independent Composite Brigade (1ª Brigada Mista Independente, 1ª BMI), established in 1976. After the end of the Cold War, the brigade was redesignated the Independent Mechanized Brigade (Brigada Mecanizada Independente), which then became the Mechanized Brigade in 2006.

=== International missions ===
- Implementation Force in Bosnia and Herzegovina;
- SFOR in Bosnia and Herzegovina;
- Kosovo Force in Kosovo;
- UNTAET in East Timor;
- UNMISET in East Timor;
- NATO Training Mission in Iraq;
- UNIFIL in Lebanon;
- Resolute Support Mission in Afghanistan;
- NATO Vigilance Activities in Slovakia.

== Organization ==
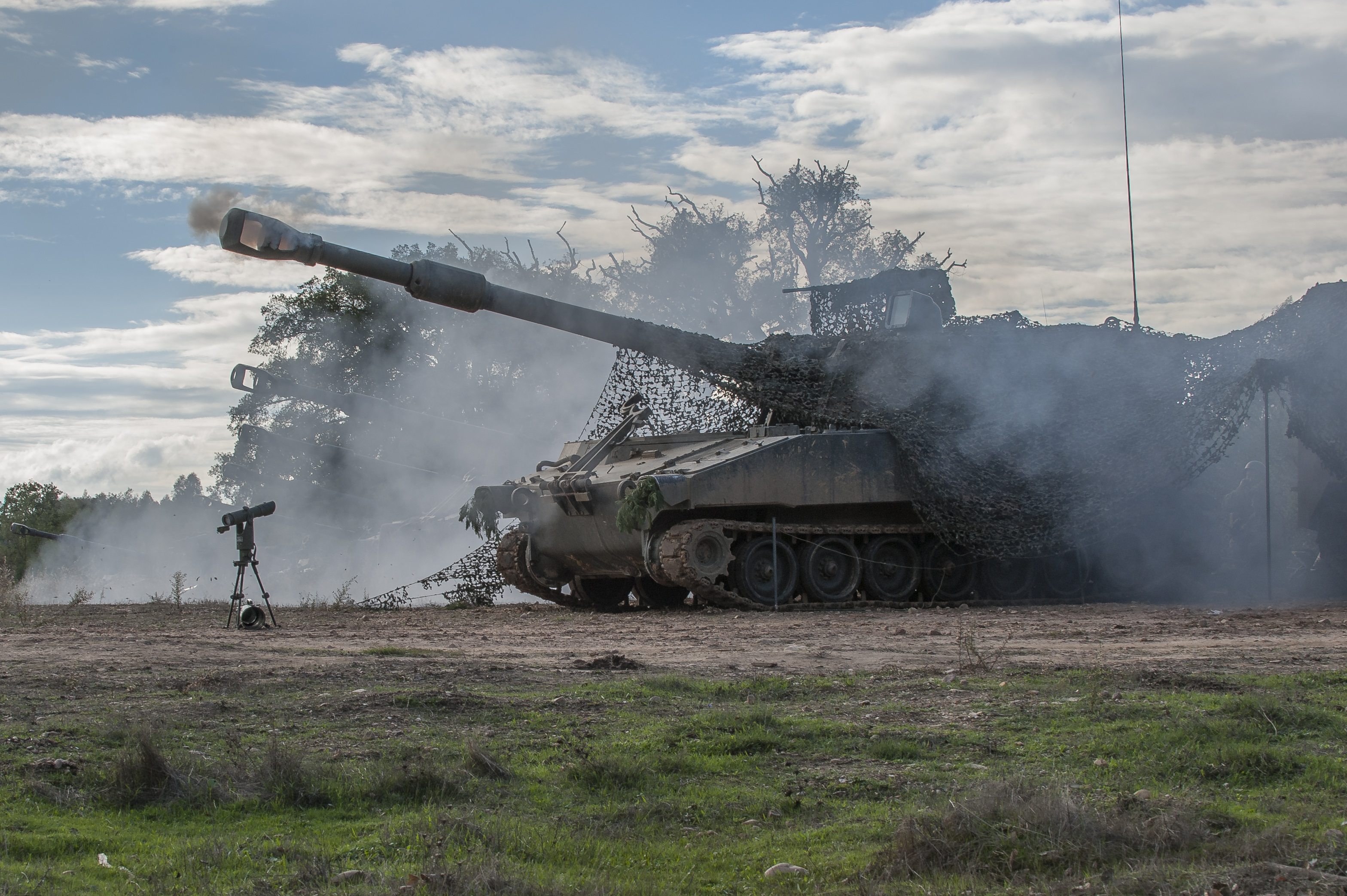
Portuguese Army Field Artillery Battery M109A5

The Mechanized Brigade differs from the army's other two brigades as its units aren't provided by regiments. All units of the Mechanized Brigade are part of the Mechanized Brigade at all times and are all based at the Santa Margarida Camp. The following units are part of the Mechanized Brigade:

- Mechanized Brigade (Brigada Mecanizada), in Santa Margarida da Coutada
  - Command and Services Company (Companhia de Comando e Serviços), in Santa Margarida da Coutada
  - Reconnaissance Squadron (Esquadrão de Reconhecimento), in Santa Margarida da Coutada, with Leopard 2A6 main battle tanks
  - Tank Group (Grupo de Carros de Combate), in Santa Margarida da Coutada
    - Group Command and Command Detachment
    - 2× Tank squadrons, with Leopard 2A6 main battle tanks
  - Heavy Infantry Battalion (Batalhão de Infantaria Pesado), in Santa Margarida da Coutada
    - Battalion Command and Command Detachment
    - 3× Heavy infantry companies, with M113A2 armoured personnel carriers
  - Self-propelled 15,5 Field Artillery Group (Grupo Artilharia de Campanha 15,5 Autopropulsionado), in Santa Margarida da Coutada
    - Group Command and Command Detachment
    - 3× Self-propelled field artillery batteries, with M109A5 155mm self-propelled howitzers
  - Services Support Battalion (Batalhão de Apoio de Serviços), in Santa Margarida da Coutada
    - Battalion Command and Command Detachment (Comando e Destacamento de Comando)
    - Maintenance Company (Companhia de Manutenção)
    - Transport and Supply Company (Companhia de Reabastecimento e Transportes)
  - Anti-aircraft Artillery Battery (Bateria de Artilharia Antiaérea), in Santa Margarida da Coutada, with FIM-92 Stinger man-portable air-defense systems
  - Heavy Combat Engineer Company (Companhia de Engenharia de Combate Pesada), in Santa Margarida da Coutada, with M60 AVLB armoured vehicle-launched bridges
  - Signal Company (Companhia de Transmissões), in Santa Margarida da Coutada, with M577A2 command post carriers
  - Santa Margarida Military Camp (Campo Militar de Santa Margarida), in Santa Margarida da Coutada

== Equipment ==
Armored Vehicles
Name	Origin	Number	Image	Notes
Main battle tanks
Leopard 2 A6	Germany	34		Initially 37 units acquired in 2008, together with 1 unit for training and 1 unit in version 2 A4 for parts supply. In March 2023, 3 units were transferred to Ukraine in order to support the defensive effort against the Russian invasion.
Armored tracked vehicles
M113A1/A2	United States	210		255 M113A1/A2 APC received (208 in service). 45 units sent to Ukraine as military aid.: 101 M113A2 received from the United States in 1977; 104 M113A2 received from Netherlands in 1993; 50 M113A1/A1G received from Germany in 1994
M901A1 ITV	United States	4		Initially 25 units would be received from the United States, but hydraulic problems were found in 21 units, so only 4 units were received in 1993 with 900 missiles.
M113 BGM-71 TOW	United States	17		M113A2 equipped with anti-tank guided missile TOW 2.
M577	United States	49		68 M577A2 received (43 in service as command vehicles and 3 in service as ambulance vehicles). 2 units sent to Ukraine as military aid.: 10 M577A2 received in 1995; 24 M577A2 received in 1997; 18 M577A2 received in 1998; 10 M577A2 received in 1999; 6 M577A2 received in 2000
M106A2 mortar carrier	United States	18		3 M106 and 15 M106A2, equipped with 107mm M30 mortar.
M125A1/A2 mortar carrier	United States	15		3 M125A1 and 12 M125A2, equipped with 81mm M29 mortar.
Self-propelled artillery
M109A5	United States	18		Self-propelled howitzer. In process of overhaul (little modernization and repair)
M109A2	United States	6		The Portuguese Army currently has 6 M109A2 stored at the military base of Santa Margarida. These M109A2 are part of the war reserves of the Portuguese Army and can be prepared to enter the active service.
Armoured recovery vehicles
M88A1/A1G Recovery Vehicle	United States	8		6 M88A1 and 2 M88A2G are in service since 1978.
M578 light recovery vehicle	United States	29		21 in service since 1995 and 8 in service since 1997.
Armoured Engineering vehicles
Carro Blindado Lança Pontes M60 AVLB m/1981	United States	4		4 are in service since 1981, operated by Engineer Company, (Companhia de Engenharia Combate Pesado or CEngCombPes).
Armoured Training vehicles
Leopard 2 Driver Training Tank	Germany	1		One unit in service since 2008, used for training Leopard 2 A6 new drivers.
Special vehicles
M548	United States	24		Used by the Mechanized Brigade to carry ammunition to the M109A5.
Armoured infantry mobility vehicles
HMMWV M1025A2	United States			Some units used by the Engineer Company (Companhia de Engenharia Combate Pesado or CEngCombPes)
