= Safir T-series =

Safir T-14
- Type: Shotgun
- Place of origin: Turkey

Production history
- Manufacturer: AKSA int arms
- Produced: 2001

Specifications
- Mass: 2.7 kg (5.9 lb)
- Length: 960 mm (37.8 in) (stock folded)
- Cartridge: 12, 16, 20 and .410 -gauge shells or slugs
- Caliber: 12, 16, 20, and .410 gauge
- Action: semi automatic and gas operated
- Feed system: 5+1, 9+1, 10+1 and 15+1 round Box Magazine
- Sights: Iron/ STANAG rails

The Safir T-series is a line of firearms produced by AKSA Int Arms, also known as Safir Arms of Turkey.

== Safir T-12 ==
A semi-automatic shotgun in 12 gauge.

== Safir T-15 and T-16 ==
The Safir T-15 is a semi-automatic rifle based on the AR-15. It is intended for civilian and police use, but Safir arms makes selective-fire version of the same design as the T-16 for military customers as well as a manually operated version for those who can not legally own semiautomatic rifles.

== Safir T-14 ==
The Safir T-14 is a semi-automatic shotgun. chambered in the .410 round that operates on a short stroke piston and outwardly resembles an AR-15.

== See also ==
- Benelli M3
- Franchi SPAS-12
- Heckler & Koch FABARM FP6
- Fabarm SDASS Tactical
