= Fabarm SDASS Tactical =

- Type: Shotgun
- Place of origin: Italy

Service history
- In service: 2005–present
- Used by: Italy
- Wars: None

Production history
- Designer: Fabbrica Bresciana Armi S.p.A. (FABARM)
- Designed: 2002
- Produced: 2005–present

Specifications (Fabarm SDASS Tactical)
- Mass: 3.00 kg
- Barrel length: 510 mm
- Cartridge: 12 Gauge
- Action: manually operated pump-action
- Effective firing range: 50 m
- Feed system: 7+1 rounds internal tube magazine

The Fabarm SDASS Tactical is a shotgun designed for police and/or security uses and has some special features such as folding front sight, built-in Picatinny rails on the top of the receiver, lengthened forearm to provide better control over the gun. SDASS shotguns are manufactured in a variety of differing styles.

== SDASS Tactical ==
This is the main production variant; the others stem off of this design with slight body differences. However the internal mechanisms are the same. SDASS stands for Special Defence And Security Shotgun and is aimed for security personnel.

The receiver is manufactured from Ergal 55 alloy which makes for a lightweight shotgun at only 3 kg, light compared to many other tactical shotguns such as the Franchi SPAS-12 which weighs close to 5 kg.

The bolt is locked into place by a piece of aluminum which swings into place and engages a notch in the barrel extension to lock the bolt to the barrel. This prevents a misfire from dropping as it acts as a crude safety device. Misfires from dropping are common in shotguns such as double-barreled shotguns.

The SDASS has an under-barrel tubular magazine like many other semi-automatic shotguns and holds 7 cartridges plus 1 in the chamber giving a total capacity of 8.

The stock is made from a composite polymer which is the most changed structural feature among the different SDASS variants. Common changes to the stock include shortening, addition of a pistol grip and changing the material of the stock altogether like in the SDASS Trainer.

A variety of sights can be placed on the Picatinny rail above the receiver such as red dot sights. As well as sights, tactical lights and laser pointers can also be placed on this rail.

The standard Fabarm SDASS Tactical retails for $649 however its variants range in price from $600 all the way to $900.

== Variants ==
=== SDASS Composite ===
This is the same layout as the SDASS Tactical except it doesn't have the Picatinny rail.

=== SDASS Heavy Combat ===
The Heavy Combat has a longer 61 cm barrel which is also much heavier. It also has a pistol grip like the Benelli M3 instead of a built in grip like the Mossberg 500.

=== SDASS Trainer ===
The SDASS Trainer is the lightweight version of the SDASS Composite. It is the only variant to come in more than one finish and they are black, nickel and carbon. To make the gun lighter the barrel heat shield has holes drilled into it to reduce weight and the heavier alloys are replaced with lighter alloys.

=== SDASS Compact ===
The SDASS Compact as the name suggests is a compact shotgun for close quarters combat. It has a pistol grip and no rear stock. A folding stock however can be attached onto a clip at the rear of the gun. The rest of the external and internal mechanisms are the same as the Tactical model.

== Users ==
- Portugal: Used by Portuguese Army (Special Operations Troops Centre), Portuguese Air Force (NOTP), National Republican Guard and Polícia de Segurança Pública.
- France : GIGN

== Related weapons ==
- Akdal MKA 1919
- Benelli M3
- Franchi SPAS-12
- Heckler & Koch FABARM FP6
- Safir T-14
