= Fernando Robles =

Portuguese former second lieutenant

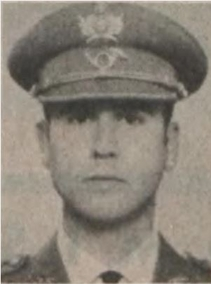
Fernando Robles in 1969

Fernando Augusto Colaço Leal Robles or Fernando Robles (born 15 August 1940) is a Portuguese former Second Lieutenant (later Colonel) who participated in initial counterinsurgency operations against insurgent União dos Povos de Angola (UPA) guerrillas operating in northern Angola during 1961, at the onset of the Portuguese Colonial War. He was born in Coimbra.

== Career ==
After graduating from Colégio Militar and failing his second year at Academia Militar, Robles was initially commissioned a conscripted second lieutenant (in Portuguese "Alferes miliciano") of infantry. In 1960, he volunteered for training and assignment to a new Portuguese special operations and counterinsurgency force, the Companhias de Caçadores Especiais (Special Sharpshooter Companies, or CCE). The initial Caçadores Especiais companies were composed of volunteers from standard infantry units who were considered better adapted for intensive training in antiguerrilla operations. Trained at the Centro de Instrução de Operações Especiais (CIOE, or Center for Special Operations Instruction) in Lamego, the CCE were the first Portuguese troops to wear the brown beret and camouflage combat uniform in combat.

Robles duly graduated and was assigned to the 6ª Companhia de Caçadores Especiais, which deployed to Luanda, Angola the same year along with three other Caçadores Especiais companies. While participating in operations in northern Angola against UPA rebels in and around the area known as Dembos, in Cuanza Norte Province in Angola, the 6ª Companhia de Caçadores Especiais became notorious for its reprisals against secessionist native Angolans in a brutal "eye for an eye, tooth for a tooth" counterinsurgency campaign. On the other hand, the contribution this company gave to the saving of thousands of lives (white and mixed-blood settlers and native farm workers who didn't join UPA) cannot be denied.

For his bravery while participating in the operations against the UPA, 2nd Lt. Robles was awarded the Medalha de Prata de Valor Militar com palma (Silver Military Medal of Valor with Palm). After re-joining and graduating from Academia Militar he joined the Portuguese Commandos. As a lieutenant and later on a captain of this special force, Robles served in Guinea-Bissau and – for a second time – in Angola, where he remained until 1975. After the war he was transferred to the Guarda Nacional Republicana and retired as a colonel in 2002.

=== Awards ===
- Military Valor Medal (Silver with Palm) (MPVM) (Note: Portuguese: Medalha de Valor Militar – Grau Prata com Palma – At the center of the ribbon, a national shield is placed, resting on a golden armillary sphere.) (Portugal)

== See also ==
- Angolan War of Independence
- Portuguese Colonial War
