= Special Operations Troops Centre =

Portuguese Army unit for unconventional warfare and counter-terrorism training

Portuguese Army Special Operations Troops Centre
- Portuguese: Centro de Tropas de Operações Especiais
- Active: 1960–present
- Country: Portugal
- Branch: Portuguese Army
- Type: Special forces Special operations
- Role: Counter-terrorism, direct action, special reconnaissance, unconventional warfare, long range patrols, hostage rescue
- Size: Two companies
- Part of: Rapid Reaction Brigade
- Garrison/HQ: Lamego, Portugal
- Nickname(s): Rangers
- Motto(s): Latin: Que os muitos por ser poucos não temamos he Brave tho' few shall ne'er the Many fear (from The Lusiads, Canto VIII, 36, v. 7)
- Website: https://www.exercito.pt/pt/recrutamento/tropas-especiais/opera%C3%A7%C3%B5es-especiais

Insignia
- Identification symbol: Special Operations Qualification Badge

The CTOE - Centro de Tropas de Operações Especiais (Special Operations Troops Centre), based in Lamego, is a unit of the Portuguese Army with the mission of instructing troops in unconventional warfare and counter-terrorism. Until 2006, it was known as CIOE - Centro de Instrução de Operações Especiais (Special Operations Instruction Centre).

The CTOE contains an operational unit called FOE - Força de Operações Especiais (Special Operations Force), popularly known as Rangers, tasked with performing missions like their counterparts such as US Army's Delta Force or British Special Air Service. Some of these missions include conducting long-range reconnaissance patrols, raids against high-value targets and enemy bases or hideouts, hostage rescue, covert operations, guerrilla warfare, locating enemy command and control centres, targeting and destruction of enemy air defences and radar systems, and POW rescue operations. The unit can be infiltrated by parachute, helicopter, small boat, or by foot.

== History ==
The CTOE, heir of the historical traditions of Regimento de Infantaria 9 (9th Infantry Regiment), was created on 16 April 1960 to form units specialised in counter-guerrilla operations, psychological operations, and mountaineering. These special, light-infantry units were called Caçadores Especiais (Special Hunters; the regular army light-infantry units were just called Hunters) and were the first units in the Portuguese Army to wear a beret (brown) and camouflage. They were elite units, with highly motivated, hand-picked personnel, whose instructors had taken courses on counter-insurgency and counter-guerrilla operations in France, Algeria, the United States, the United Kingdom, and Spain. When the Portuguese Colonial War began in 1961, there were already four companies of Special Hunters in Angola. Early in the fighting, the Caçadores Especiais received updated 7,62 mm NATO small arms such as the Espingarda m/961 (Heckler & Koch G3) and the FN/German G1 FAL rifle (known as the m/962); the FAL was a favored weapon of the Caçadores Especiais due to its lighter weight and better practical accuracy compared to the m/961 G3. The 4th Company Caçadores Especiais in particular was a very active one (their website contains many photos and detailed mission chronology, ). Still, by the end of 1961, the Special Hunters had been disbanded: some of their training was incorporated into the instruction of the regular army Hunter companies, and the brown beret and camouflage spread to the whole Army. The CTOE remained, now tasked with giving their courses to officers and NCOs, and to form commando troops.

After the creation of the special operations unit in 1981, the CTOE ceased to be just an instruction facility but also served as the HQ for the new Portuguese special operations unit. The unit members wear a grass green beret and are the heir of the Special Hunters: the beret badge includes a trumpet — a symbol of the Special Hunters; and the unit is known as Rangers because the first instructors of the Special Hunters completed the United States Army Ranger Course and adapted the characteristics of that training to the Special Operations Course. The unit has operated in Bosnia and Herzegovina, East-Timor, Kosovo, Afghanistan, Iraq and Mali.

== CTOE courses ==
The CTOE has several courses:

- COE - Curso de Operações Especiais (Special Operations Course): direct action (reconnaissance, raids, hostage and POW rescues) and indirect action (insurgency and guerrilla, counter-insurgency and counter-guerrilla, military aid)].
- Sniper Course (requires previous COE).
- Long Range Reconnaissance Patrol Course (requires previous COE): reconnaissance and direct action special operations.
- Irregular Operations Course (only for officers and NCOs of the permanent cadre): organisation, instruction, and orientation of irregular forces with of the objective of defending the national territory (Portugal) when invaded and start the resistance.
- Psychological Operations Course.
- Mountaineering Course.
- Terrorist Threats' Prevention and Combat Course.

For those already badged as special operations soldiers, there are also courses outside the CTOE:

- Combat Diving Course
- Demolitions Course
- Forward Air Controller Course
- Combat Medic Course
- Signals Course
- NBC Course
- HUMINT Course
- Military Parachuting Course
- Small Boat Handling Course

Special Operations soldiers also take courses in friendly countries:

- Airborne / Special Forces - United States
- Sniper Course - United Kingdom
- Winter Patrol Course - Germany
- Long Range Reconnaissance Patrol School Course - Germany
- Special Operations Course - Spain
- Cold weather training - Norway
- Jungle Warfare - Brazil

== Organization ==
The CTOE is regiment level unit, commanded by a colonel, which includes:

- Commanding officer
  - Staff
- Headquarters Company
- Training Battalion
- Public Attendance Office
- Special Operations Force

== Special Operations Force ==
The Special Operations Force (FOE - Força de Operações Especiais) is the operational component of the CTOE. It can constitute a special operations task group (SOTG) or it can contribute to a joint SOTG which can be created with special operations elements from other branches of the Armed Forces. This force is the Portuguese equivalent to the 1st SFOD-D & 22nd Special Air Service.

=== Organisation ===
The FOE is commanded by a lieutenant-colonel and includes six special operations task units (SOTU). Each SOTU is commanded by a captain (except SOTU A1, which is commanded by a major) and includes 16 elements (only officers and NCOs).

The FOE includes:

- Headquarters and Staff
- Headquarters Company
  - Headquarters
  - Communications Platoon
  - Medical Platoon
  - Sniper Platoon
  - Support Platoon
  - Joint Terminal Attack Controller Section,
  - Technical Exploitations Operations Section
  - Mini-Unmanned Aerial Vehicle Section;
- SOTU A1
- SOTU A2
- SOTU B1
- SOTU B2
- SOTU C1
- SOTU C2

=== Selection and training ===
Training to become a member of the Special Operations Force takes 30-32 weeks (30 weeks for enlisted soldiers, 32 weeks for officer and non-commissioned officers. Successful candidates are expected to serve a minimum of two years.

This is broken down in the following stages:

Basic training; This 5 weeks stage aims to provide the candidate with basic military training, with an introduction to military culture at this stage.

Additional training (stage 1); This 7 week stage aims to provide advanced military training, and combat technique is given at this stage.

Additional training (stage 2); This 5 week stage aims to provide the military with military leadership training, at this stage command and leadership modules are taught. This training is only for Officer, and Non-commissioned Officers.

Special Operations Force course; The Special Operations Specialty course enables the military to carry out missions of a strategic, operational or tactical scope, with a high degree of independence and in conditions of great risk and in which qualities of spirit of sacrifice, adaptation, tenacity, strong will and constant, rusticity and resistance, sobriety and discretion, camaraderie and cohesion. This stage is 13 weeks for enlisted men, while for Officers and Non-Commissioned Officers it is 15 weeks.

== Equipment ==
=== Handguns ===
- Glock 17 Gen 5
- Heckler & Koch P30 limited use

=== Shotguns ===
- Fabarm STF 12
- Franchi SPAS-15
- Benelli M4 Super 90
- Benelli Supernova

=== Submachine guns ===
- Heckler und Koch MP5A5, Heckler und Koch MP5SD6 and Heckler und Koch MP5KA4

=== Assault rifles ===
- Heckler und Koch HK417A2
- Heckler und Koch HK416, A5 and A7 variants.
- Heckler und Koch G36K, Heckler und Koch G36KE and Heckler und Koch G36C

=== Machine guns ===
- H&K MG4
- FN Minimi Mk3
- FN MAG
- Browning M2HB

=== Sniper rifles ===
- Barrett M107
- Barrett M95
- Accuracy International Arctic Warfare-SF
- Accuracy International AWSM (L115A1) and L115A3 limited use
- Accuracy International AXMC .338
- Heckler & Koch G28 sniper limited use

=== Grenade launchers ===
- Heckler & Koch 269 (Used on Heckler & Koch HK416)
- Heckler & Koch AG36 (Used on Heckler & Koch G36)
- Heckler & Koch GMG

=== Anti-tank weapons ===
- Carl Gustaf M3
- M72A3 LAW

=== Vehicles ===
- URO VAMTAC ST5
- Ranger Special Operations Vehicle
- Land Rover Defender 110
- Mitsubishi L200
- Polaris Sportsman MV850
- Polaris MRZR D2
- Polaris MRZR D4

== See also ==
- Fernando Robles
- Equipment of the Portuguese Army
- Portuguese Army
