= Manitou Group =

French heavy equipment manufacturer

- Type: Société Anonyme – SA (French publicly-traded limited company)
- Traded as: Euronext Paris: MTU; CAC Small component
- Industry: manufacture of lifting and handling equipment
- Founded: 1957
- Headquarters: Ancenis, France
- Revenue: ▲€2.87 billion (2023)
- Net income: ▲€143 million (2023)
- Number of employees: 5,500
- Website: www.manitou-group.com/en/

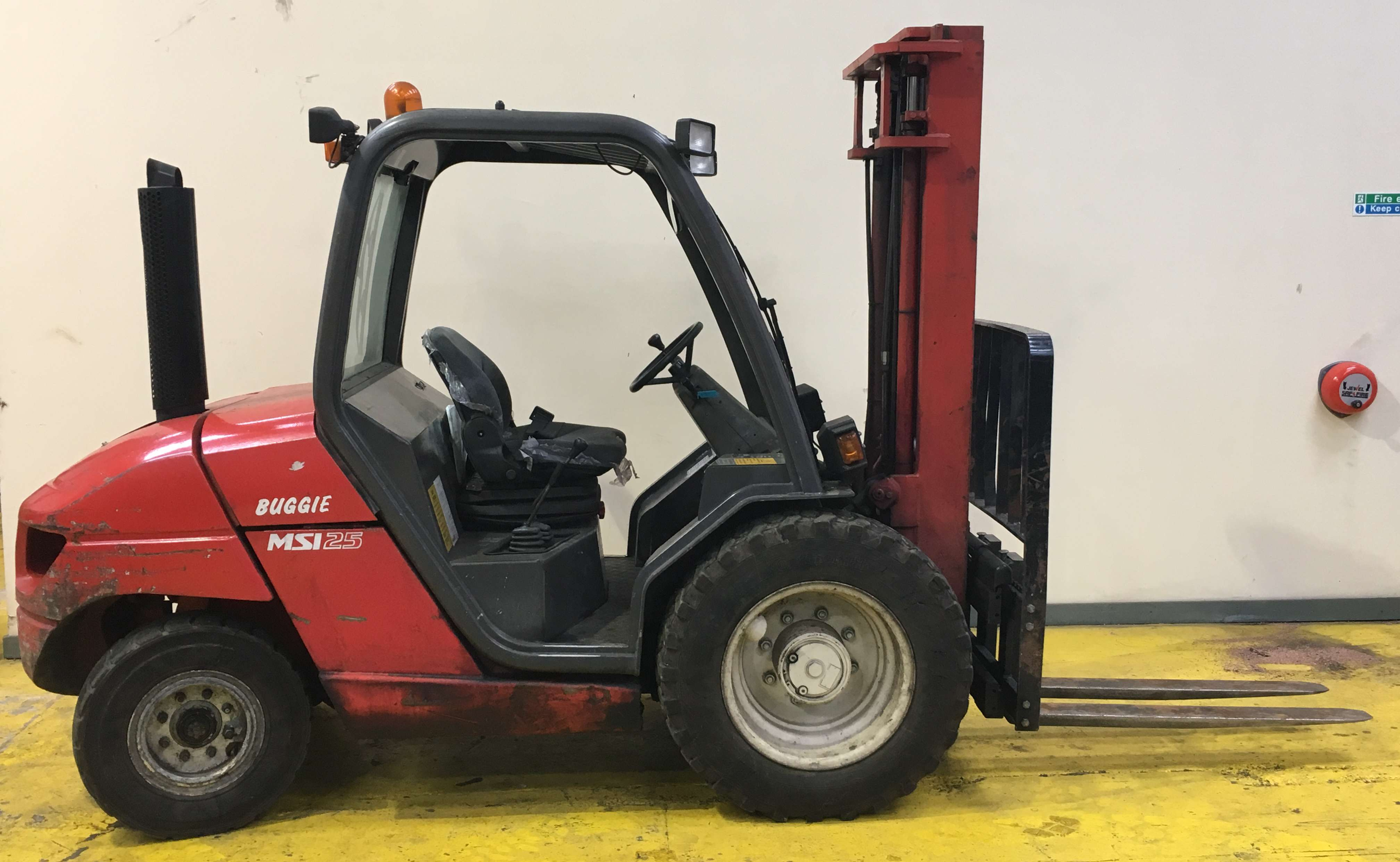
Manitou MSI25 Rough Terrain forklift

Manitou is a French heavy equipment manufacturer that makes forklifts, cherry pickers, telehandlers, and other heavy equipment. Manitou started in France in 1957 when Marcel Braud designed the first forklift truck for use in rough terrain. Its headquarters are in Ancenis.

The firm expanded internationally, with Manitou UK formed in 1971, Manitou Italia in 1985, Manitou BeNeLux in 1990, Manitou Portugal in 1993, Manitou Australia in 2004, Manitou Vostok (Russia) in 2005, and Manitou Poland in 2007.

Company revenues first exceeded €1 billion in 2007.

Yanmar purchased 6.26% of the company in 2012.

Manitou was a finalist at the European Rental Awards 2019 organised by the European Rental Association.

In November 2022, it was announced Manitou had acquired one of its authorised service and repair companies, the Castelfranco-based, Gi.Erre.

In December 2022, it was announced Manitou had acquired an 82 percent stake in easyLi, the Chasseneuil-du-Poitou-based producer of lithium-ion batteries.

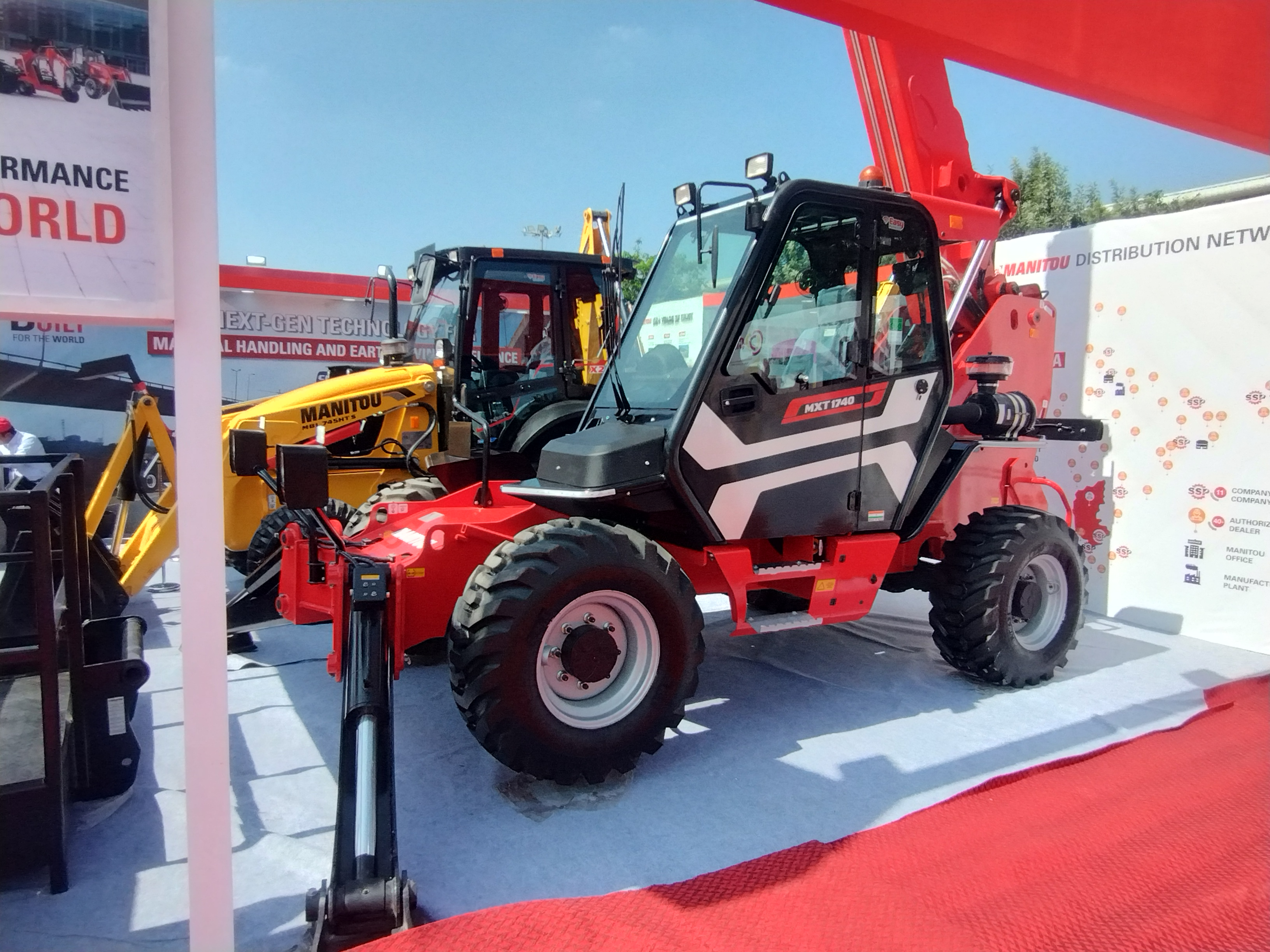
Manitou telehandler and backhoe loader vehicles at EXCON 2025, BIEC
