= Santa Margarida da Coutada =

- Civil parish
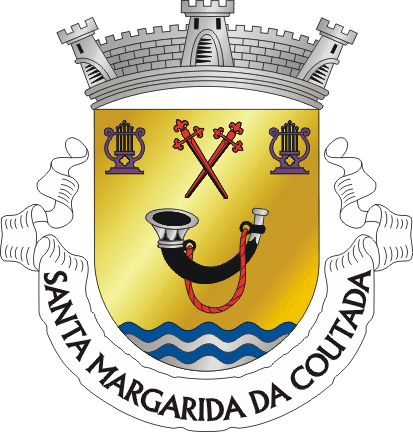
- Coat of arms

- Location in Portugal
- Coordinates: 39.446°N 8.311°W
- Country: Portugal
- Region: Oeste e Vale do Tejo
- Intermunic. comm.: Médio Tejo
- District: Santarém
- Municipality: Constância

Area
  - Total: 58.72 km^{2} (22.67 sq mi)

Population (2011)
  - Total: 1,788
  - Density: 30/km^{2} (79/sq mi)
- Time zone: UTC+00:00 (WET)
  - Summer (DST): UTC+01:00 (WEST)

Santa Margarida da Coutada is a parish (freguesia) in the municipality of Constância in Portugal. The population in 2011 was 1,788, in an area of 58.72 km^{2}.
