= Azores Military Zone =

- Zona Militar dos Açores
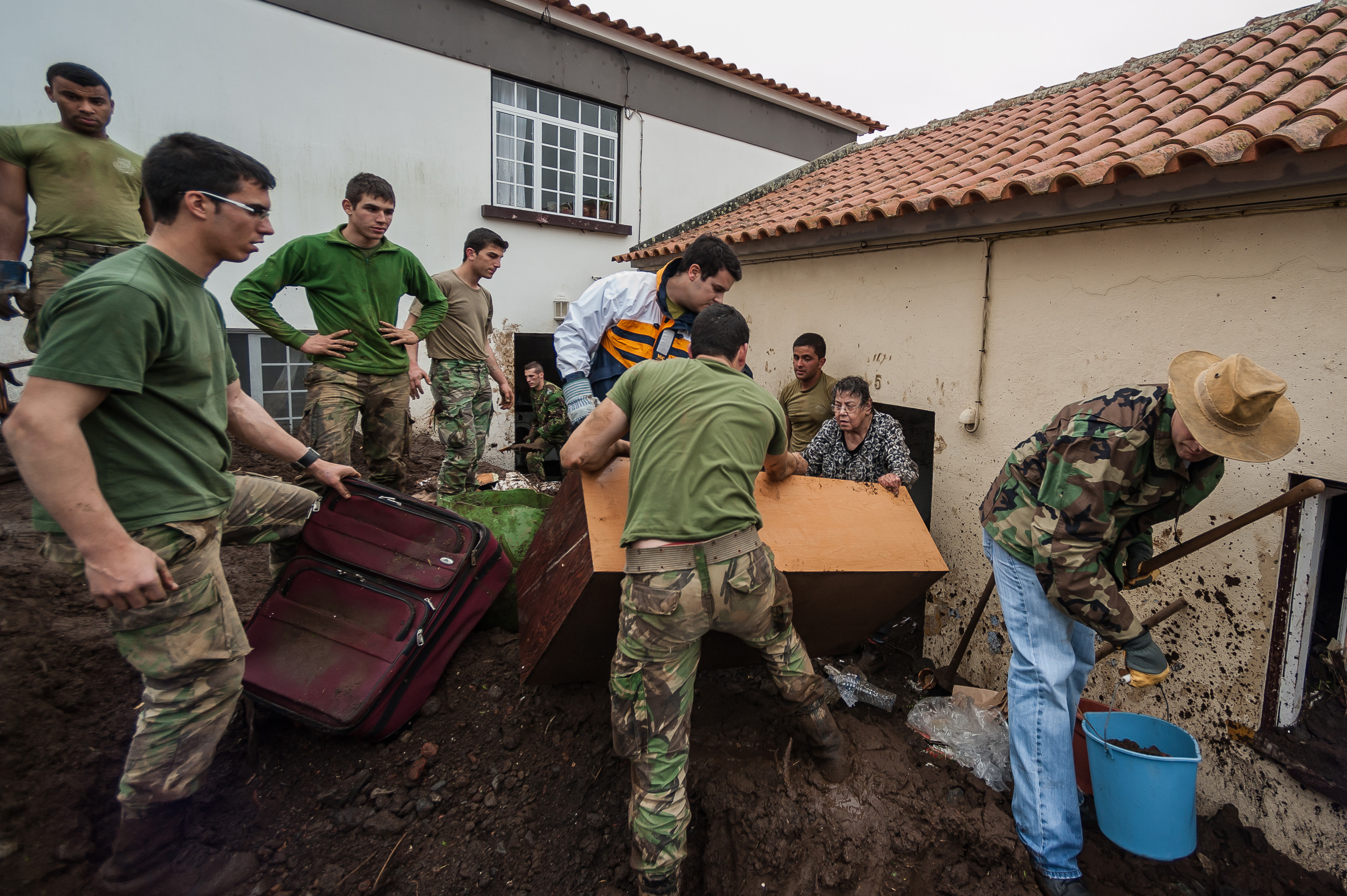
- Portuguese Army members from Regimento de Guarnição Nº1, Azores
- Country: Portugal
- Branch: Portuguese Army
- Type: Army
- Role: Land Force
- Part of: Land Forces Command (CFT)
- Motto(s): Sempre Prontos; Always Ready
- Equipment: Glock Benelli Supernova FN SCAR

The Azores Military Zone (Portuguese: Zona Militar dos Açores) or ZMA, headquartered in Ponta Delgada, is the Portuguese Army's command responsible for the readying, the training and the operational command of the ground forces stationed in the archipelago of the Azores.

Until 2006, the ZMA was considered a territorial command. Presently, it is an element of the operational component of the system of forces of the Portuguese Army.

The ZMA is commanded by a brigadier-general, administratively dependent on the Army's Land Forces Command, but operationally dependent on the joint Azores Operational Command.

== History ==
The Military Zone of the Azores originates from the 10th Military Division, created in 1836, with headquarters in Angra do Heroismo. It has since been successively reorganized, adopting various denominations:

- 1868 - 5th Military Division;
- 1884 - Central Command of the Azores;
- 1901 - Military Command of the Azores;
- 1926 - Military Government of the Azores;
- 1937 - Military Command of the Azores;
- 1960 - Independent Territorial Command of the Azores.

In 1977, it adopted its present name.

== Organisation ==
The Military Zone of the Azores is organised as:

- QGZMA - ZMA Headquarters, Ponta Delgada
- RG1 - 1st Garrison Regiment, Angra do Heroísmo
- RG2 - 2nd Garrison Regiment, Ponta Delgada

Each Garrison Regiment maintains one infantry battalion. Additionally the 1st Garrison Regiment maintains a heavy mortar company and the 2nd Garrison Regiment an anti-aircraft battery. The two Garrison Regiments are supported by a Support Unit under the direct control of the 'Commander Azores Military Zone'.

The ZMA deploys the ZMA Forces (FZMA) as its operational force. The FZMA is made up of operational units fielded by the RG1 and RG2 and can be reinforced by additional elements deployed from units not belonging to the ZMA. Permanently, it includes an infantry battalion from the RG1 and an infantry battalion and an anti-aircraft battery from the RG2.

== See also ==
- Military history of Portugal
- Portuguese Military Academy
