= Extrema Ratio (knife) =

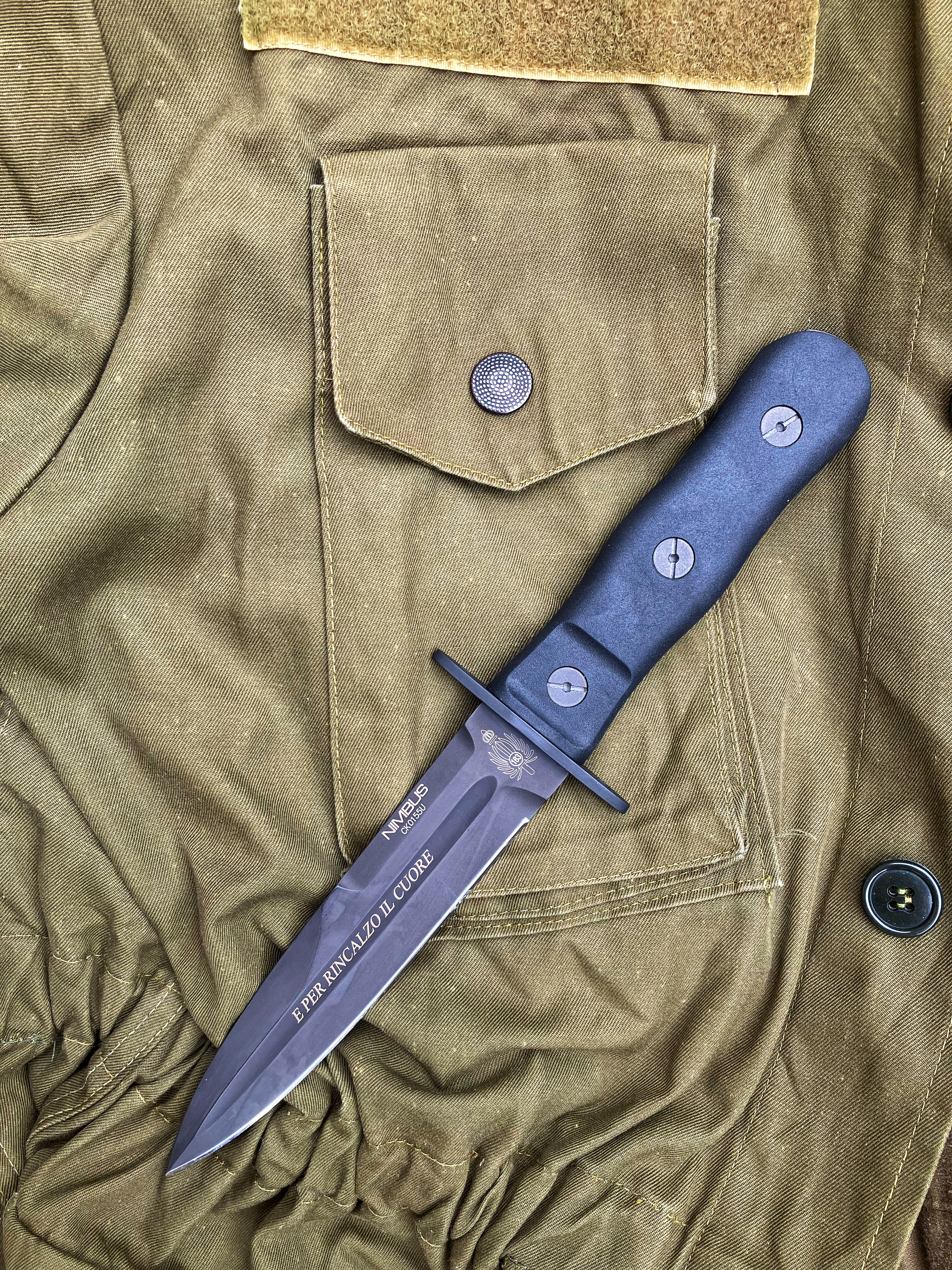
An Extrema Ratio dagger

Extrema Ratio is an Italian knife company. It was founded in 1997 by Maurizio Castrati and Mauro Chiostri in Prato. It is known for the design and manufacture of military and camping knives.

The Latin phrases "Extrema Ratio" means last possible course of action.
