= War reserve stock =

Peacetime stockpile of materiel or strategic raw materials

A war reserve stock (WRS)/pre-positioned stocks (PPS), is a collection of warfighting materiel held in reserve in pre-positioned storage to be used if needed in wartime. They may be located strategically depending on where it is believed they will be needed. In addition to military equipment, a war reserve stock may include raw materials that might become scarce during wartime. According to this definition, storage such as the Strategic Petroleum Reserve may be considered a war stock.

== United States ==
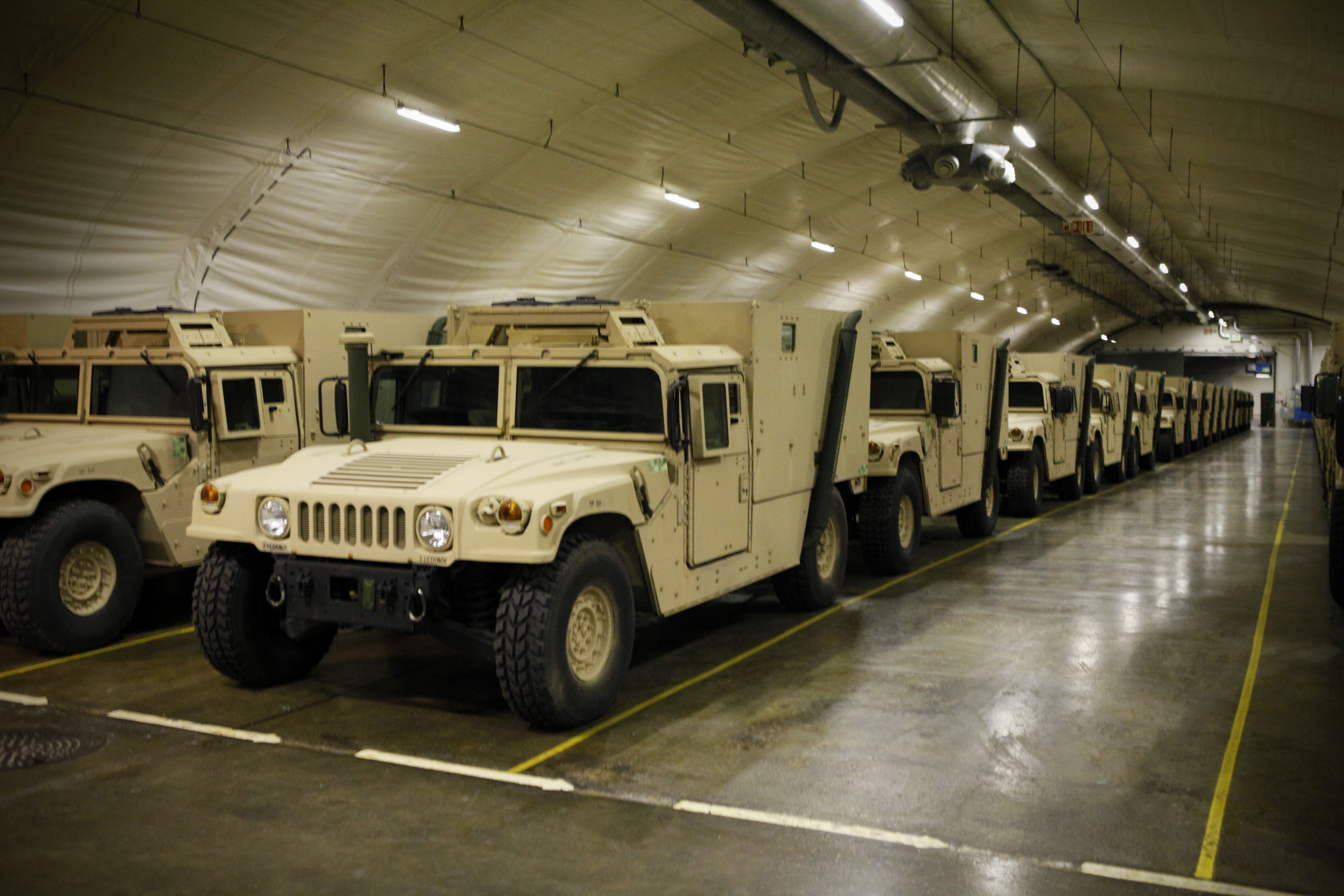
United States Marine Corps vehicles stored in a Norwegian cave in 2012 as part of the Marine Corps Prepositioning Program-Norway

The United States' Department of Defense maintains war reserve stocks around the world, mainly in NATO countries and in some major non-NATO allies. The US 31st Munitions Squadron is tasked with maintaining and distributing the largest war reserve stockpiles of munitions for the United States Air Forces in Europe.

Conflicts of high intensity and lengthy duration may have to rely mostly on supplies that are produced while they are ongoing. The first and second World Wars provide examples of this. But smaller wars of shorter duration where belligerents have already stockpiled sufficiently for the outbreak of conflict are able to rely on pre-existing stock. The U.S. Invasion of Grenada (1983) or Panama in 1989, in particular, were small enough to be almost wholly reliant on existing stock.

=== War Reserves Stock Allies – Israel ===
War Reserves Stock Allies-Israel also known as War Reserve Stockpile Ammunition-Israel or simply WRSA-I was established in the 1990s and is maintained by the United States European Command. It is one of the United States' biggest War Reserves, located within Israel. Initially the WRSA-I stock had $100 million worth of reserves; however, prior to the 2014 Gaza War the WRSA-I had nearly $1 billion worth of reserves, with an authorization to increase this to $1.2 billion. In 2014 with the passing of the 2014 United States—Israel Strategic Partnership Act, the US agreed to increase the stock to $1.8 billion.

The stock includes ammunition, smart bombs, missiles, military vehicles and a military hospital with 500 beds. These supplies are situated in six different locations throughout the country.

When needed, Israel can request to access the WRSA-I stock, but the request would need to be approved by the US Congress. During the 2014 Gaza War, the US authorized Israel to access 120 mm mortar rounds and 40 mm grenade launcher ammunition. These munitions were part of a set of older items in the stock, and were due to be replaced soon.

With the agreement of the Israeli government, the United States transferred large numbers of 155 mm artillery rounds from WRSA-I stocks to Ukraine following the Russian invasion of the country in 2022. The United States committed to replenish the stocks held in Israel, and to dispatch ammunition to Israel urgently if needed.

== Israel ==
Israel maintains their own war reserves stock, in addition to the WRSA-I that the US stores in Israel.

Within their war reserves, Israel keeps ammunition, spare parts and replacement equipment needed for at least a month of intense combat. The majority of the Israeli reserves are purchased from the US, due to their $3 billion in military aid from the US that requires 75% of the money to be spent on equipment purchased from the US. In total, including the period since 1949 up to the present day the US has granted almost $84 billion in foreign aid to Israel.

Additionally in August 2014, during Operation Protective Edge the US passed The Iron Dome Bill to allow $225 million in addition funding to allow Israel to increase their war reserves for the Iron Dome.

== UK ==
The United Kingdom maintains a war reserve stock that has been criticized by the National Audit Office as being unnecessary. The Ministry of Defence typically does not dispose of old stock, creating a backlog of outdated materiel that has previously been retired. The NAO reported in June 2012 that the annual cost of maintaining the nation's entire war reserve stockpile was £277 million.

== Use of war reserve stock ==
Some examples of war reserve stock being used include:

- 1956–1962, Algerian War: France used NATO war reserve stock stored in Europe.
- 1956: Suez Crisis: The United Kingdom and France used NATO war reserve stock for Operation Musketeer.
- 1973, Yom Kippur War: The United States allowed Israel to use some of its war reserve stock.
- 1982: Falklands War: The United Kingdom used its own and NATO war reserve fuel and ammunition stock.
- 1990–1991, Operation Desert Shield and Gulf War: The Coalition of the Gulf War used NATO war reserve fuel and ammunition stock from Europe and Turkey.
- 2006 Lebanon War: The United States allowed the Israeli Defense Forces to access these reserves.
- 2014 Israel–Gaza conflict: The United States allowed the Israeli Defense Forces to resupply from its War Reserve Stockpile in Israel.

== See also ==
- List of established military terms
- Glossary of military abbreviations
- Strategic reserve
- Enduring Stockpile
