= Heckler & Koch FABARM FP6 =

FP6
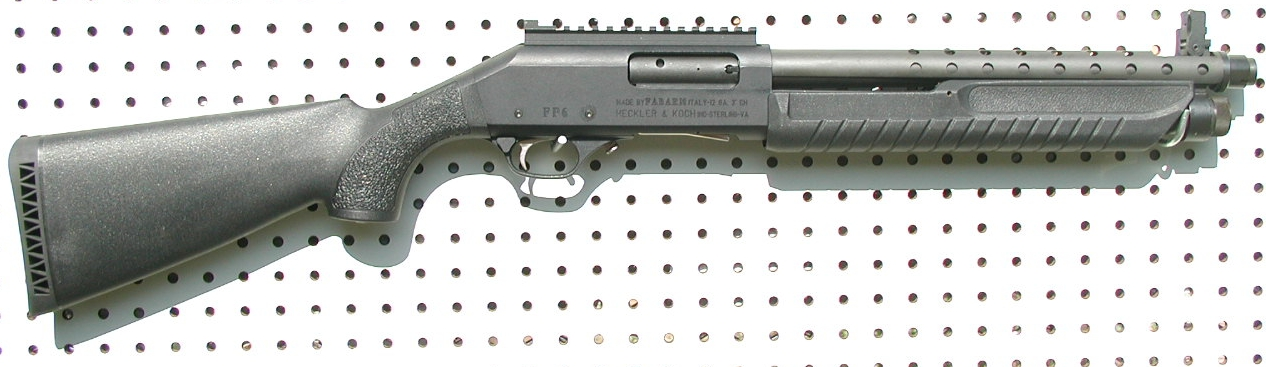
- Type: Combat shotgun Riot shotgun Pump action Shotgun
- Place of origin: Italy

Service history
- Used by: See Users

Production history
- Designer: FABARM
- Designed: 1998
- Manufacturer: FABARM
- Produced: 1998–present
- Variants: 4

Specifications
- Mass: 6.6 lb
- Length: 41.25 in, 105cm
- Barrel length: 20 in, 51cm
- Cartridge: 12 gauge 2 3/4 & 3 inch shells
- Action: pump-action
- Effective firing range: 30 m
- Feed system: 5+1 rounds or 7+1 rounds, internal tube magazine
- Sights: Night

The Fabarm FP6 is a pump-action combat shotgun that was manufactured by the Italian firearms company Fabbrica Bresciana Armi S.p.A. (FABARM) and sold by Heckler & Koch. It was intended for civilian and law enforcement use.

== History ==
Upon severing business association with Benelli in 1998, Heckler & Koch replaced their entire line of shotguns with those manufactured by FABARM. The line featured hunting and sport shotguns in over-and-under, side-by-side, semi-automatic autoloaders and pump shotguns including youth models. For military, law enforcement and home defense use, H&K released four variants of the FP6 model.

== Design details ==
The machined receiver is manufactured from lightweight Ergal 55 alloy and is drilled and tapped for scope mounting. Three of the four variants were sold with an attached Picatinny rail for mounting optics or accessories and the bottom forward edge of the forend is also drilled to accept an accessory rail. With the exception of the short-barreled model, FABARM shotguns are sold with their Tribore barrel which is a deep-drilled, machined barrel with three separate internal bore profiles. Beginning at the chamber and forcing cone, the bore is enlarged to .7401" to soften recoil while the second profile is in the middle of the barrel gradually choking down to .7244" to emulate a cylinder bore profile to increase velocity. The final bore is the FABARM choke system which consists of standard choking followed by a cylinder profile at the muzzle which serves to improve shot patterns and distribution. The muzzle is threaded to accept one of five different chokes or a muzzle brake/compensator. Some models were sold with a ventilated barrel shroud.

Features of the weapon include a chrome-plated trigger, slide release, and shell carrier. There is also an oversized triangular push-button safety. The trigger group is held in the receiver by two pins which makes removal for cleaning and maintenance very easy. Some models have a flip-up frontsight (which serves as a low-profile sight when closed) while others have a small blade sight. Other models were issued with ghost-ring sights.

The forend and buttstock are synthetic black polymer with the latter having a synthetic rubber recoil pad mounted on the end. One model was issued instead with a heavy wire gauge folding stock and pistol grip. Models were available with either a black anodized protective finish, matte finish, or were finished in carbon fiber.

== Operation ==
The forend is connected to dual action bars which cycle the bolt when pulled back towards the receiver. As it travels to the rear, the shell latch is pushed out of the way by a camming surface on the action bar allowing a cartridge to drop into the carrier while the remaining shells in the magazine tube are held by the cartridge retaining latch. As the forend is returned, the action bars bring the bolt forward while the carrier aligns the shell before seating it into the chamber. After the shell is fully seated, the action bars continue forward forcing the locking bolt into a recess which is on top of the barrel extension causing the action to lock into battery. Upon firing the weapon, the slide unhooking lever releases and the action is allowed to cycle, extracting and ejecting the spent shell while cocking the hammer and releasing the next round from the magazine.

== Accessories ==
All FP6 shotguns are sold with a choke adjustment wrench, owners manual and a hard plastic vacu-formed impact case. Additional accessories available from H&K include an assortment of chokes, muzzle brakes/compensators, magazine tube extensions, pistol grips and folding stocks. There is an adapter available for the receiver of the FP6 to allow use of Remington 870 stocks such as BlackHawk and Knoxx stocks.

== Variants ==
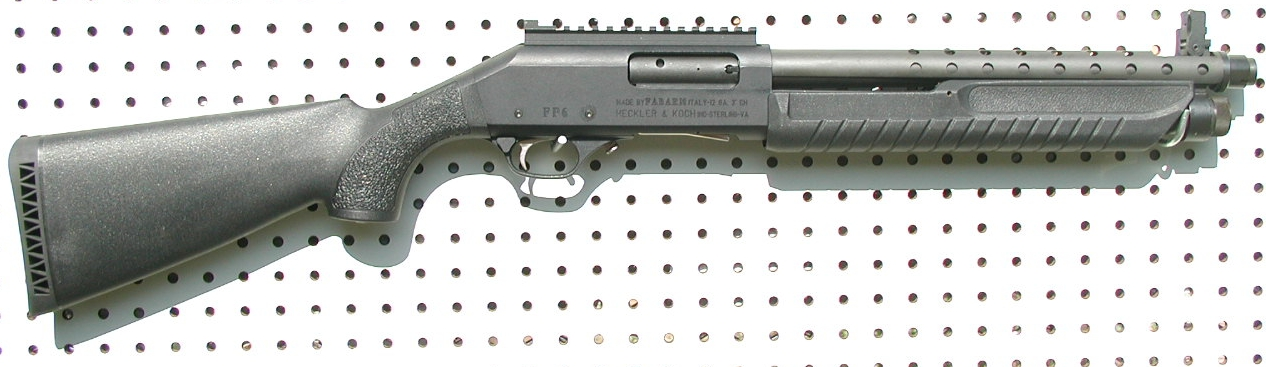
FP6 Entry - this variant features a 14" barrel and is regulated by the National Firearms Act as a Title II firearm in the United States.

H&K released four variants of the FP6.

- Standard FP6 (H&K 40621HS) featuring a 20" Tribore barrel, black protective finish, perforated heatshield, small front blade sight, fixed synthetic buttstock, and a rounded forend.
- Carbon fiber finish model (H&K 40621CF) featuring a 20" Tribore barrel, no heatshield, receiver-mount Picatinny rail, small front blade sight, fixed synthetic buttstock, and a rounded forend.
- Folding stock and pistol gripped model with a 20" Tribore barrel, no heatshield, receiver-mount Picatinny rail, and a large flip-up blade sight.
- Tactical short-barreled model, the FP6 Entry (H&K 40621T), featuring a 14" barrel, matte finish, perforated heatshield, receiver-mount Picatinny rail, large flip-up blade sight, fixed synthetic buttstock, and a contoured forend. This variant has a 33.75" overall length and is regulated by the National Firearms Act as a Title II firearm in the United States.

== Users ==
- France - National Gendarmerie
- Germany - GSG 9, replacing all Remington Model 870P
- Italy
- Japan
- Malaysia
- United States
