= Structure of the Portuguese Army =

This article lists the structure of the Portuguese Army in 2023:

== Chief of the Army Staff ==
The Chief of the Army General Staff heads the Portuguese Army and has 7 organizations which report directly to the Chief of the Army Staff.

- Chief of the Army Staff (General Chefe do Estado-Maior do Exército), in Lisbon
  - Army Superior Council (Conselho Superior do Exército), in Lisbon
  - Army Superior Disciplinary Council (Conselho Superior de Disciplina do Exército), in Lisbon
  - Army Medical Appeal Board (Junta Médica de Recurso do Exército), in Lisbon
  - Army General Inspectorate (Inspeção-Geral do Exército), in Amadora
  - Military Academy (Academia Militar), in Lisbon
  - National Medicine Laboratory (Laboratório Nacional do Medicamento), in Lisbon
  - Army Journal (Jornal do Exército), in Lisbon

=== Deputy Chief of the Army Staff ===
- Deputy Chief of the Army Staff (Vice-Chefe do Estado-Maior do Exército), in Lisbon
  - Army General Staff (Estado-Maior do Exército)
  - Communications and Information Department (Direção de Comunicações e Informação), in Lisbon
    - Army Geospatial Information Center (Centro de Informação Geoespacial do Exército), in Lisbon
      - Geospatial Support Unit (Unidade de Apoio Geoespacial) (operationally assigned to the Information, Surveillance, Target Acquisition and Reconnaissance Group, Rapid Reaction Brigade)
    - Army Signal Center (Centro de Transmissões do Exército), in Lisbon
    - Information Warfare and Cyberspace Center (Centro de Guerra da Informação e Ciberespaço), in Lisbon
  - Military History and Culture Department (Direção de História e Cultura Militar), in Lisbon
    - Army General Archive (Arquivo Geral do Exército), in Lisbon
    - Army Library (Biblioteca do Exército), in Lisbon
    - Military Historical Archive (Arquivo Histórico-Militar), in Lisbon
    - Bragança Military Museum (Museu Militar de Bragança), in Bragança
    - Buçaco Military Museum (Museu Militar do Buçaco), in Luso
    - Elvas Military Museum (Museu Militar de Elvas), in Elvas
    - Lisbon Military Museum (Museu Militar de Lisboa), in Lisbon
    - Porto Military Museum (Museu Militar do Porto), in Porto
  - Education Department (Direção de Educação), in Lisbon
    - Military College (Colégio Militar), in Lisbon
    - Army Pupils Institute (Instituto dos Pupilos do Exército), in Lisbon
  - Army Experimentation and Technological Modernization Center (Centro de Experimentação e Modernização Tecnológica do Exército), in Paço de Arcos
  - Army General Staff Support Unit (Unidade de Apoio do Estado-Maior do Exército), in Lisbon

=== Central Bodies of Administration and Management ===
The Central Administration and Management Bodies (OCAD) have a functional nature and aim to ensure the direction and execution of specific essential areas, namely in the management of human, material, financial, information and infrastructure resources. The Army's OCAD are: the Personnel Command (CmdPess), the Logistics Command (CmdLog) and the Finance Directorate (DFin).

==== Personnel Command ====
- Personnel Command (Comando do Pessoal), in Porto
  - Human Resources Management Department (Direção de Administração de Recursos Humanos), in Porto
    - Recruitment Center Lisbon (Centro de Recrutamento de Lisboa), in Lisbon
    - Recruitment Center Vila Nova de Gaia (Centro de Recrutamento de Vila Nova de Gaia), in Vila Nova de Gaia
    - Selection and Classification Office Amadora (Gabinete de Classificação e Seleção da Amadora), in Amadora
    - Selection and Classification Office Vila Nova de Gaia (Gabinete de Classificação e Seleção de Vila Nova de Gaia), in Vila Nova de Gaia
    - Public Service Office Aveiro (Gabinete de Atendimento ao Público de Aveiro), in Aveiro
    - Public Service Office Braga (Gabinete de Atendimento ao Público de Braga), in Braga
    - Public Service Office Bragança (Gabinete de Atendimento ao Público de Bragança), in Bragança
    - Public Service Office Castelo Branco (Gabinete de Atendimento ao Público de Castelo Branco), in Castelo Branco
    - Public Service Office Chaves (Gabinete de Atendimento ao Público de Chaves), in Chaves
    - Public Service Office Coimbra (Gabinete de Atendimento ao Público de Coimbra), in Coimbra
    - Public Service Office Évora (Gabinete de Atendimento ao Público de Évora), in Évora
    - Public Service Office Funchal (Gabinete de Atendimento ao Público do Funchal), in Funchal
    - Public Service Office Guarda (Gabinete de Atendimento ao Público da Guarda), in Guarda
    - Public Service Office Lamego (Gabinete de Atendimento ao Público de Lamego), in Lamego
    - Public Service Office Lisboa (Gabinete de Atendimento ao Público de Lisboa), in Lisbon
    - Public Service Office Ponta Delgada (Gabinete de Atendimento ao Público de Ponta Delgada), in Ponta Delgada
    - Public Service Office Santarém (Gabinete de Atendimento ao Público de Santarém), in Santarém
    - Public Service Office Tavira (Gabinete de Atendimento ao Público de Tavira), in Tavira
    - Public Service Office Tomar (Gabinete de Atendimento ao Público de Tomar), in Tomar
    - Public Service Office Vila Real (Gabinete de Atendimento ao Público de Vila Real), in Vila Real
    - Public Service Office Viseu (Gabinete de Atendimento ao Público de Viseu), in Viseu
  - Training Department (Direção de Formação), in Évora
    - Combat Arms School (Escola das Armas), in Mafra
    - Services School (Escola dos Serviços), in Póvoa de Varzim
      - Supply and Services Company (Companhia de Reabastecimento e Serviços)
    - Army Sergeants School (Escola de Sargentos do Exército), in Caldas da Rainha
  - Health Department (Direção de Saúde), in Lisbon
    - Military Health Center Coimbra (Centro de Saúde Militar de Coimbra), in Coimbra
    - Military Health Center Tancos/Santa Margarida (Centro de Saúde Militar Tancos/Santa Margarida), in Tancos and Santa Margarida da Coutada
    - Type II Health Unit Amadora (Unidade de Saúde Tipo II da Amadora), in Amadora
    - Type II Health Unit Évora (Unidade de Saúde Tipo II de Évora), in Évora
    - Type II Health Unit Funchal (Unidade de Saúde Tipo II de Funchal), in Funchal (Madeira Island)
    - Type II Health Unit Azores (Unidade de Saúde Tipo II de Açores), in Ponta Delgada (São Miguel Island)
    - Military Laboratory Unit for Biological and Chemical Defense (Unidade Militar Laboratorial de Defesa Biológica e Química), in Lisbon
    - Military Veterinary Medicine Unit (Unidade Militar de Medicina Veterinária), in Lisbon
  - Personnel Services Department (Direção de Serviços de Pessoal), in Vila Nova de Gaia
    - Army Band (Banda do Exército), in Queluz
    - Army Fanfare (Fanfarra do Exército), in Paço de Arcos
    - Military Prison Establishment (Estabelecimento Prisional Militar), in Tomar
  - Army Applied Psychology Center (Centro de Psicologia Aplicada Exército), in Queluz
  - Personnel Command Support Unit (Unidade de Apoio do Comando do Pessoal), in Vila Nova de Gaia

==== Logistics Command ====
- Logistics Command (Comando da Logística), in Lisbon
  - Acquisition Department (Direção de Aquisições), in Lisbon
  - Infrastructure Department (Direção de Infraestruturas), in Lisbon
  - Supply and Transport Department (Direção de Reabastecimento e Transportes), in Lisbon
    - Transport Regiment (Regimento de Transportes), in Lisbon
      - Transport Company (Companhia de Transportes)
    - Army General Material Support Unit (Unidade de Apoio Geral de Material do Exército), in Benavente
  - Maintenance and Weapon Systems Department (Direção de Manutenção e Sistemas de Armas), in Lisbon
    - Maintenance Regiment (Regimento de Manutenção), in Entroncamento
      - General Support Forces and Emergency Military Support Maintenance Company
      - Maintenance Company (operationally assigned to the Intervention Brigade Support Unit)
      - Maintenance Company (operationally assigned to the Rapid Reaction Brigade Support Unit)
  - Logistics Command Support Unit (Unidade de Apoio do Comando da Logística), in Paço de Arcos

==== Finance Department ====
- Finance Department (Departamento de Finanças), in Lisbon

=== Land Forces Command ===
Location of the main Army base units in Continental Portugal. Off-map to west are RG1 and RG2 (Azores) and RG3 (Madeira). Colors represent:
– Units of the Mechanized Brigade (BriMec)
– Units of the Rapid Reaction Brigade (BriRR)
– Units of the Intervention Brigade (BrigInt)
– General support units
- Land Forces Command (Comando das Forças Terrestres), in Lisbon
  - Engineer Regiment No. 1 (Regimento de Engenharia N.º 1), in Tancos
    - Engineer Battalion (Batalhão de Engenharia)
      - 1st General Support Engineer Company (1.ª Companhia de Engenharia de Apoio Geral)
      - 2nd General Support Engineer Company (2.ª Companhia de Engenharia de Apoio Geral), in Espinho (detached from the Engineer Regiment No. 3, Intervention Brigade)
      - Bridge Company (Companhia de Pontes)
      - Nuclear, Biological, Chemical and Radiological Defense Company (Companhia de Defesa Nuclear, Biológica, Química e Radiológica)
      - Explosive Ordnance Disposal Teams Group (Grupo de Equipas de Inativação de Engenhos Explosivos)
      - Light Combat Engineer Company (Companhia de Engenharia de Combate Ligeira) (operationally assigned to the Rapid Reaction Brigade)
      - Emergency Military Support Engineer Company (Companhia de Engenharia de Apoio Militar de Emergência) (operationally assigned to the Emergency Military Support Regiment)
  - Lancers Regiment No. 2 (Regimento de Lanceiros N.º 2), in Amadora
    - Army Police Group (Grupo de Polícia do Exército)
  - Signal Regiment (Regimento de Transmissões), in Porto
    - Signal Battalion
    - Electronic Warfare Company (operationally assigned to the Information, Surveillance, Target Acquisition and Reconnaissance Group, Rapid Reaction Brigade)
  - Emergency Military Support Regiment (Regimento de Apoio Militar de Emergência), in Abrantes
    - Emergency Military Support Unit (Unidade de Apoio Militar de Emergência)
    - CIMIC General Company Command Element (Elemento do Comando da Companhia Geral CIMIC)
    - Army CIMIC Detachment (Destacamento CIMIC do Exército)
    - Emergency Military Support Engineer Company (Companhia de Engenharia de Apoio Militar de Emergência) (detached from the Engineer Regiment No. 1)
  - Army Military Intelligence and Security Center (Centro Militar de Segurança e Informações do Exército), in Amadora
  - Tactical Training, Simulation and Certification Center (Centro de Capacitação Tática Simulação e Certificação), in Santa Margarida da Coutada
  - Medical Group (Agrupamento Sanitário), in Tancos

==== Mechanized Brigade ====
- Mechanized Brigade (Brigada Mecanizada), in Santa Margarida da Coutada
  - Command and Services Company (Companhia de Comando e Serviços), in Santa Margarida da Coutada
  - Reconnaissance Squadron (Esquadrão de Reconhecimento), in Santa Margarida da Coutada, with Leopard 2A6 main battle tanks
  - Tank Group (Grupo de Carros de Combate), in Santa Margarida da Coutada
    - Group Command and Command Detachment
    - 2× Tank squadrons, with Leopard 2A6 main battle tanks
  - Heavy Infantry Battalion (Batalhão de Infantaria Pesado), in Santa Margarida da Coutada
    - Battalion Command and Command Detachment
    - 3× Heavy infantry companies, with M113A2 armoured personnel carriers
  - Self-propelled 15,5 Field Artillery Group (Grupo Artilharia de Campanha 15,5 Autopropulsionado), in Santa Margarida da Coutada
    - Group Command and Command Detachment
    - 3× Self-propelled field artillery batteries, with M109A5 155mm self-propelled howitzers
  - Services Support Battalion (Batalhão de Apoio de Serviços), in Santa Margarida da Coutada
    - Battalion Command and Command Detachment (Comando e Destacamento de Comando)
    - Maintenance Company (Companhia de Manutenção)
    - Transport and Supply Company (Companhia de Reabastecimento e Transportes)
  - Anti-aircraft Artillery Battery (Bateria de Artilharia Antiaérea), in Santa Margarida da Coutada, with FIM-92 Stinger man-portable air-defense systems
  - Heavy Combat Engineer Company (Companhia de Engenharia de Combate Pesada), in Santa Margarida da Coutada, with M60 AVLB armoured vehicle-launched bridges
  - Signal Company (Companhia de Transmissões), in Santa Margarida da Coutada, with M577A2 command post carriers
  - Santa Margarida Military Camp (Campo Militar de Santa Margarida), in Santa Margarida da Coutada

==== Intervention Brigade ====
- Intervention Brigade (Brigada de Intervenção), in Coimbra
  - Command and Services Company (Companhia de Comando e Serviços), in Coimbra
  - Cavalry Regiment No. 6 (Regimento de Cavalaria N.º 6), in Braga
    - Reconnaissance Group (Grupo de Reconhecimento), with Pandur II armoured personnel carriers
  - Infantry Regiment No. 13 (Regimento de Infantaria N.º 13), in Vila Real
    - 1st Wheeled Mechanized Infantry Battalion (1.º Batalhão de Infantaria Mecanizado de Rodas)
  - Infantry Regiment No. 14 (Regimento de Infantaria N.º 14), in Viseu
    - 2nd Wheeled Mechanized Infantry Battalion (2.º Batalhão de Infantaria Mecanizado de Rodas)
  - Infantry Regiment No. 19 (Regimento de Infantaria N.º 19) (Training unit), in Chaves
  - Artillery Regiment No. 5 (Regimento de Artilharia N.º 5), in Vendas Novas
    - Towed 15,5 Field Artillery Group (Grupo de Artilharia de Campanha 15,5 Rebocado), with M114A1 155mm towed howitzers
    - Surveillance Systems Company (Companhia de Sistemas de Vigilância) (operationally assigned to the Information, Surveillance, Target Acquisition and Reconnaissance Group, Rapid Reaction Brigade)
  - Anti-Aircraft Artillery Regiment No. 1 (Regimento de Artilharia Antiaérea N.º 1), in Queluz
    - Anti-aircraft Artillery Group (Grupo de Artilharia Antiaérea), with FIM-92 Stinger man-portable air-defense systems
  - Engineer Regiment No. 3 (Regimento de Engenharia N.º 3), in Espinho
    - Medium Combat Engineer Company (Companhia de Engenharia de Combate Média)
    - 2nd General Support Engineer Company (2.ª Companhia de Engenharia de Apoio Geral) (operationally assigned to the Engineer Battalion, Engineer Regiment No. 1)
  - Intervention Brigade Support Unit (Unidade de Apoio da Brigada de Intervenção), in Coimbra
    - Medium Services Support Unit
    - Maintenance Company (detached from the Maintenance Regiment)
    - Type I Health Unit

==== Rapid Reaction Brigade ====
- Rapid Reaction Brigade (Brigada de Reação Rápida), in Tancos
  - Command and Services Company (Companhia de Comando e Serviços), in Tancos
  - Cavalry Regiment No. 3 (Regimento de Cavalaria N.º 3), in Estremoz
    - Information, Surveillance, Target Acquisition and Reconnaissance Group (Agrupamento de Informações, Vigilância, Aquisição de Objetivos e Reconhecimento) (ISTAR Group)
      - Command and Services Company (Companhia de Comando e Serviços)
      - Reconnaissance Squadron (Esquadrão de Reconhecimento)
      - C2 Intelligence Fusion Company (Companhia de C2 Intelligence Fusion)
      - HUMINT/Counter-Intelligence Platoon (Pelotão HUMINT/Counter-Intelligence)
      - Surveillance Systems Company (Companhia de Sistemas de Vigilância), in Vendas Novas (detached from the Artillery Regiment No. 5, Intervention Brigade)
      - Electronic Warfare Company (Companhia de Guerra Eletrónica), in Porto (detached from the Signal Regiment)
      - Geospatial Support Unit (Unidade de Apoio Geoespacial), in Lisbon (detached from the Army Geospatial Information Center)
  - Infantry Regiment No. 1 (Regimento de Infantaria N.º 1) (Training unit), in Beja
  - Infantry Regiment No. 10 (Regimento de Infantaria N.º 10), in São Jacinto Airfield
    - 2nd Paratroopers Infantry Battalion (2.º Batalhão de Infantaria Paraquedista)
  - Infantry Regiment No. 15 (Regimento de Infantaria N.º 15), in Tomar
    - 1st Paratroopers Infantry Battalion (1.º Batalhão de Infantaria Paraquedista)
  - Paratroopers Regiment (Regimento de Paraquedistas), in Tancos
    - Airborne Operations Battalion (Batalhão Operacional Aeroterrestre)
      - Airborne Pathfinders Company (Companhia de Precursores Aeroterrestres)
      - Air Equipment Company (Companhia de Equipamento Aéreo) (Parachute Maintenance)
      - Air Supply Company (Companhia de Abastecimento Aéreo)
      - Service Company (Companhia de Serviços)
        - Military Working Dogs Platoon (Pelotão Cinotécnico)
  - Commando Regiment (Regimento de Comandos), in Belas
    - Commando Battalion (Batalhão de Comandos)
      - 1st Commando Company (1.ª Companhia de Comandos)
      - 2nd Commando Company (2.ª Companhia de Comandos)
      - 3rd Commando Company (3.ª Companhia de Comandos)
  - Special Operations Troops Center (Centro de Tropas de Operações Especiais), in Lamego
    - Special Operations Force (Força de Operações Especiais)
      - Command and Support Company (Companhia de Comando e Apoio)
        - Sniper Platoon (Pelotão Sniper)
        - Signal Platoon (Pelotão de Transmissões)
        - Medical Platoon (Pelotão Sanitário)
        - Support Platoon (Pelotão de Apoio)
        - Joint Terminal Attack Controller Section (Secção JTAC)
        - Technical Exploitation Operations Section (Secção TEO)
        - Mini-Unmanned Aerial Vehicle Section (Secção de mini-UAV)
      - 6× Special operations task units
  - Artillery Regiment No. 4 (Regimento de Artilharia N.º 4), in Leiria
    - Towed 10,5 Field Artillery Group (Grupo de Artilharia de Campanha 10,5 Rebocado), with L119 105mm towed howitzers
  - Rapid Reaction Brigade Support Unit (Unidade de Apoio da Brigada de Reação Rápida), in Tancos
    - Light Services Support Unit
    - Maintenance Company (detached from the Maintenance Regiment)
    - Type I Health Unit
  - Light Combat Engineer Company (Companhia de Engenharia de Combate Ligeira), in Tancos (detached from the Engineer Regiment No. 1)

==== Azores Military Zone ====
- Azores Military Zone (Zona Militar dos Açores), in Ponta Delgada (São Miguel Island)
  - Azores Military Zone Support Unit (Unidade de Apoio da Zona Militar dos Açores), in Ponta Delgada
  - Azores Military Museum (Museu Militar dos Açores), in Ponta Delgada
  - Garrison Regiment No. 1 (Regimento de Guarnição N.º 1), in Angra do Heroísmo (Terceira Island)
    - 1st Infantry Battalion (1.º Batalhão de Infantaria)
  - Garrison Regiment No. 2 (Regimento de Guarnição N.º 2), in Ponta Delgada (São Miguel Island)
    - 2nd Infantry Battalion (2.º Batalhão de Infantaria)

==== Madeira Military Zone ====
- Madeira Military Zone (Zona Militar da Madeira), in Funchal (Madeira Island)
  - Madeira Military Zone Support Unit (Unidade de Apoio da Zona Militar da Madeira), in Funchal
  - Madeira Military Museum (Museu Militar da Madeira), in Funchal
  - Garrison Regiment No. 3 (Regimento de Guarnição N.º 3), in Funchal (Madeira Island)
    - 3rd Infantry Battalion (3.º Batalhão de Infantaria)

== Land Forces Command organization graphic ==
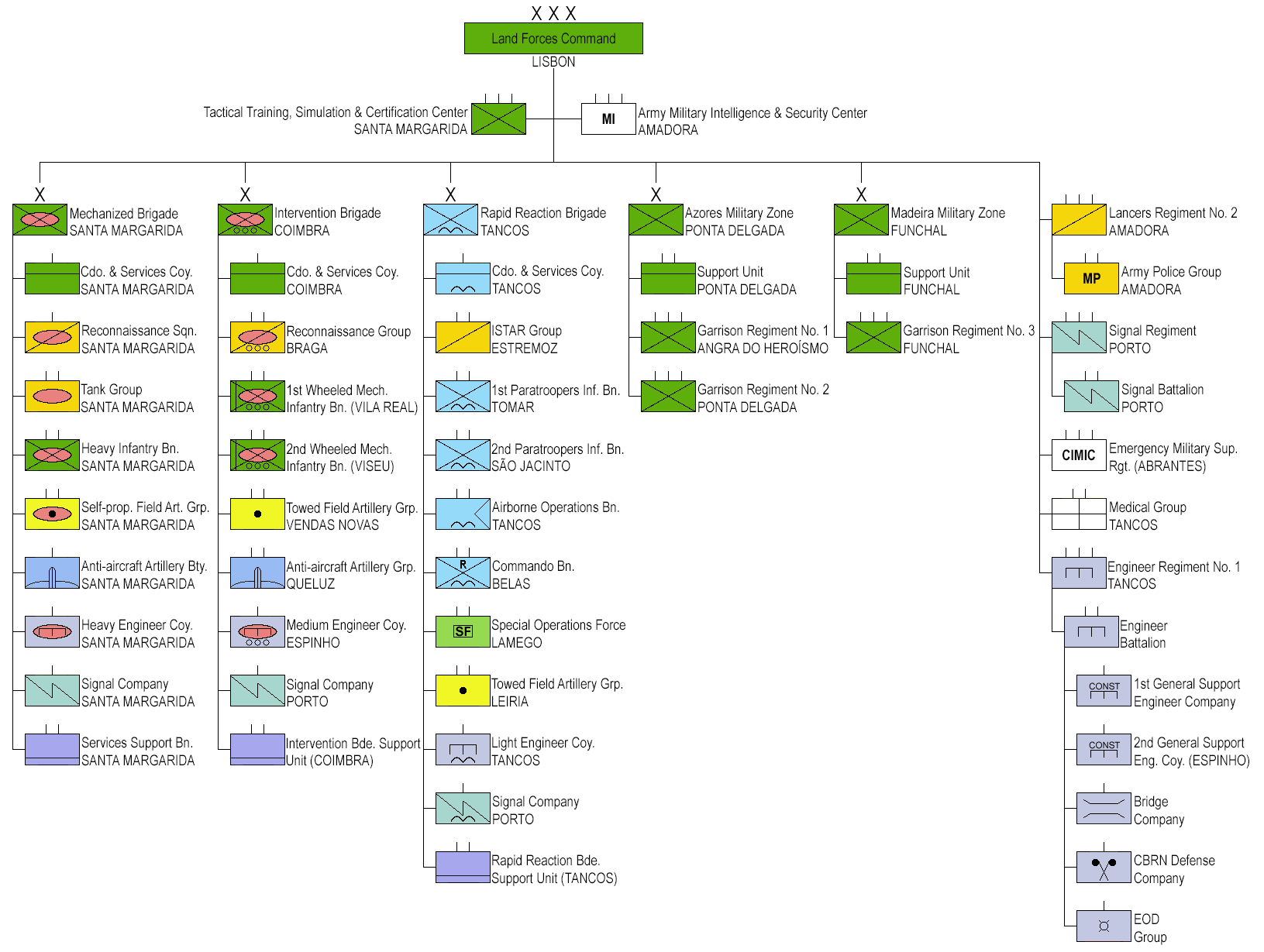
Portuguese Army Land Forces Command organization as of March 2026
