= Paratroopers Regiment (Portugal) =

Parachute Troops School
- Escola de Tropas Paraquedistas
- Parachute Troops School coat of arms
- Active: 1915-1918; 1955-present
- Country: Portugal
- Branch: Portuguese Army
- Type: Military instruction school
- Size: Two battalions
- Part of: Rapid Reaction Brigade
- Garrison/HQ: Aeroterrestrial Support Battalion; Instruction Battalion
- Nickname: Páras / Boinas Verdes (Paras / Green Berets)
- Mottos: "Que nunca por vencidos se conheçam" (Let them never be known as vanquished)
- March: Ó Pátria Mãe

The Regimento de Paraquedistas (formerly: Escola de Tropas Pára-Quedistas - Parachute Troops School), based in Tancos, Portugal, is a unit of the Portuguese Army and serves as the instruction center for recruitment and training of the Portuguese paratroopers. This unit includes an entire battalion, acting as support and reserve for airborne units which contains for example, military war dogs and airborne pathfinders and an instruction battalion responsible for the forming of new paratroopers.

The RPára is part of the Rapid Reaction Brigade that includes other elite units like the army commandos and Army Special Operations.

Like other Portuguese airborne units, the troops of the school are nicknamed "Boinas Verdes" (Green Berets) while recruits are nicknamed "Catatuas".

== History ==
=== The Airborne Battalion ===
After the successful use of airborne forces in the Second World War by Germany and the Allies, other armed forces began to examine the possibility of forming parachute troops for special missions. In 1955, Portuguese Defense Ministry cabinet approved a request for funds for airborne paratroop training.

Two Army captains went to France to take the French parachute course at the École de Troupes Aeroportèes. After the Portuguese Air Force was created as an independent branch of the military, it was decided that the paratroopers would be part of the Air Force, much like the German organizational structure during the Second World War, but organized on NATO lines. The BCP - Batalhão de Caçadores Páraquedistas (Paratrooper Hunters Battalion) was formed in 1956. The paratroopers were issued unique berets and camo uniforms similar to those of the French troops. Airborne forces initially jumped using the venerable German tri-motored Junkers Ju 52 aircraft. The unit was first deployed to Tancos, which still serves as headquarters for today's Portuguese airborne forces.

=== Colonial wars and the regiment ===
In 1961, conflict erupted in the African colonies, which soon evolved into a series of guerrilla campaigns against Portuguese rule. Troops were required to fight in Africa, and the BCP became the RCP - the Regimento de Caçadores Pára-quedistas (Paratrooper Hunter, or Ranger Regiment). By this time, the men were armed with the modern 7.62 mm ArmaLite AR-10 infantry rifle, a weapon previously not seen in Western military forces. The paratroopers liked the accuracy and mobility of the AR-10, but supplies were embargoed after initial deliveries were completed in 1960, and paratroopers were later issued the collapsible-stock variant of the m/961 (G3) rifle. As time went on, more airborne units were created in Angola, Mozambique, and other areas outside Portugal to fight the various separatist guerrilla movements.

Due to Portuguese Air Force control over airborne units, the paratroops' battalion numbers reflected their subordination to local Air Force commands. The following battalions of the regiment were assigned to the following Air Force regions:

- 1st Air Region (Air Force command over North Atlantic territories and mainland Portugal)- 11th (Portugal) and 12th (Guinéa-Bissau) Paratrooper Hunter Battalions
- 2nd Air Region (Air Force command over South Atlantic territories) - 21st Paratrooper Hunter Battalion (Angola)
- 3rd Air Region (Air Force command over the Indian Ocean territories) - the 31st and 32nd Paratrooper Hunter Battalions (Mozambique)

=== Paratrooper casualties ===
- 12th Paratrooper Hunter Battalion: 56 dead (3 officers, 6 sergeants and 47 soldiers)
- 21st Paratrooper Hunter Battalion: 47 dead (5 officers, 9 sergeants and 33 soldiers)
- 31st Paratrooper Hunter Battalion: 39 dead (2 officers, 6 sergeants and 31 soldiers)
- 32nd Paratrooper Hunter Battalion: 18 dead (2 sergeants and 16 soldiers)

A total of 160 Portuguese paratroopers were KIA.

On April 25, 1974, a military coup led by members of the Portuguese Armed Forces ended the authoritarian government regime in Portugal, and the country moved towards fully democratic elections. Shortly afterwards, peace negotiations with the various African colonies resulted in an end to the African wars, followed by the independence of Angola, Mozambique, and Guinea-Bissau. Military reforms were instituted in Portugal in 1975, resulting in a reorganization of airborne forces.

In November 2007, a paratrooper was killed in a vehicle accident in Afghanistan.

== Modern airborne forces structure ==
=== Parachute Troops Base School ===
On July 5, 1975, the BETP (Base Escola de Tropas Pára-Quedistas or Parachute Troops Base School) was established on the basis of the RCP, which was disbanded and integrated into the CTP (Corpo de Tropas Paraquedistas, Parachute Troops Corps or PTC) of the Portuguese Air Force.

The CTP is responsible for changing the paratroopers from a counter-guerrilla force to a conventional airborne force capable of fighting in a possible NATO vs Warsaw Pact war, so a Light Paratrooper Brigade (BRIPARAS) was formed with three Paratrooper Battalions and a few support units. The Corps also raised several barracks across Portugal to garrison the new brigade, BOTP1 – Base Operacional de Tropas Pára-quedistas nº1 (1st Paratrooper Operational Base) at Monsanto and BOTP2 at São Jacinto; some troops were also garrisoned in the BETP at Tancos. The BRIPARA structure included:

- Brigade HQ
- BOTP1: 11th Paratrooper Battalion, Anti-Tank Company, Signals Company
- BOTP2: 21st Paratrooper Battalion, Services and Support Operational Group, Heavy Mortar Company
- BETP: 31st Paratrooper Battalion, Aerospace and Ground Operational Group

=== Army integration ===
In 1993, further changes in the organization of airborne forces took place when the Defense Minister decided that the entire corps should leave the Portuguese Air Force and become part of the Portuguese Army. This meant also that the Commandos Regiment would be disbanded and the commandos that had taken the parachute course would be part of the new unit which was named BAI - Brigada Aerotransportada Independente (Independent Airborne Brigade).

The BETP then changed its name again to ETAT - Escola de Tropas Aerotransportadas (Airborne Troops School), the Paratrooper Corp changed to the Comando de Tropas Aerotransportas (Airborne Troops Command) and all three Paratrooper Battalions changed to Airborne Infantry Battalions (BIAT). This new Army Airborne Brigade was bigger and more powerful due to the previous Air Force Light Paratrooper Brigade; they had replaced heavy mortars with 105 mm artillery guns and were equipped with light armor vehicles.

In territorial terms the BOTP1 was closed and BOTP2 changed its name to the São Jacinto Military Area. The units of the brigade that were not at Tancos (Airborne Support Battalion) or São Jacinto (2nd BIAT) were now garrisoned at Army barracks (Regiments) like the 15th Infantry Regiment at Tomar (1st BIAT), 3rd Infantry Regiment at Beja (3rd BIAT), 4th Artillery Regiment at Leiria (Grupo de Artilharia Aerotransportada – Airborne Artillery Group), 3rd Cavalry Regiment at Estremoz (Esquadrão de Reconhecimento Aerotransportado – Airborne Recon Squadron) and others. The BAI structure was:

- 15th Infantry Regiment: 1st BIAT, Services and Support Battalion
- São Jacinto Military Area: 2nd BIAT, Anti-Tank Company
- 3rd Infantry Regiment: 3rd BIAT
- 4th Artillery Regiment: Field Artillery Group
- ETAT: Aeroterrestrial Support Battalion
- Tancos Airfield: Signals Company
- Engineering Practical School: Engineering Company
- 3rd Cavalry Regiment: Recon Squadron
- 1st Anti-Aircraft Artillery Regiment: Anti-Aircraft Artillery Battery

=== Elite Forces Brigade ===
The next reorganization of the Army though, changed the ETAT designation again to ETP – Escola de Tropas Páraquedistas (School of Parachute Troops) with the BAI being renamed and reorganized as BRR – Brigada de Reacção Rápida . The Airborne Troops Command was disbanded. Currently, airborne forces are under direct control of regular army commands, such as Land Forces Operational Command (operational units) or the Instruction Command (ETP – Paratrooper School).

The last reorganization of the Army changed ETP's name to the present Regimento de Paraquedistas (Paratroopers' Regiment), RPára.

The Elite Forces brigade is no longer a full deployable brigade, but rather an organizational structure that controls all the special trained army units.

The 3rd Airborne Infantry Battalion and Anti-Tank Company were disbanded and the other two BIAT were renamed Paratrooper Infantry Battalions (BIParas), the São Jacinto Military Area was renamed 10th Infantry Regiment, the Airborne Artillery Group and the Services and Support Battalion were transferred to the Intervention Brigade and their no longer Airborne capable and the Engineering Company and the Anti-Aircraft Artillery Battery were reduced to platoon size. This new Rapid Reaction Brigade joined all remaining Paratrooper units together with Army Special Operations and the reborn battalion-size Army Comandos unit. Finally a newly formed unit has joined BRR: UALE (Army Light Aviation Unit), which is waiting to be equipped with NH-90 TTH and a still-to-be-chosen light utility helicopter, possibly the Eurocopter EC-135 or the AgustaWestland AW109.

BRR forces include:

- 15th Infantry Regiment: 1st BIPara
- 10th Infantry Regiment: 2nd BIPara
- RPára: Aeroterrestrial Battalion
- Commandos Troop Center: Commando Battalion
- Special Operations Troop Center: Special Operations Forces
- Army Light Aviation Unit: Army Helicopter Group, Signals Company
- 3rd Cavalry Regiment: Recon Squadron
- Engineering Practical School: Engineering Platoon
- 1st Anti-Aircraft Artillery Regiment: Air Defence Platoon

== Candidate selection ==
=== General conditions ===
- Be a volunteer
- Be a Portuguese citizen
- Be at least 18 years old and 24 at the most for enlisted ranks
- Be psychophysically and physically fit
- Minimum height is 1.60m for males and 1.56m for females
- Clean criminal registry
- Minimum school grade required is the 9th for enlisted, 12th for NCOs and a college degree to officers

=== Admission tests ===
- Medical exams
- Sensorial exams
- Psychiatric and physical exams
- Biographic questionnaire
- Psychological interview
- Physical tests

== Selection and training (parachute battalions) ==
Training to join one of the parachute battalions takes 30 weeks to complete. On completion, a successful candidate is expected to serve a minimum of two years.

This is broken down in the following stages:-

Basic training; This 5 weeks stage aims to provide the candidate with basic military training, with an introduction to military culture at this stage.

Additional training (stage 1); This 7 week stage aims to provide advanced military training, and combat technique is given at this stage.

Additional training (stage 2); This 5 week stage aims to provide the military with military leadership training, at this stage command and leadership modules are taught. This training is only for Officer, and Non-commissioned Officers.

Paratrooper course; This 11 week course enables the military to perform missions of a strategic, operational or tactical scope, with a high degree of independence and in conditions of great risk through a tactical parachute jump (air landing) or assault landing, of any type.

== RPára courses ==
=== Formation courses ===
- Basic Instruction.
- Complementary Instruction.
  - Pathfinder Auxiliary Course.
  - Parachute Maintenance Course.
  - Air Supply Operator Course.
  - Trainer of Military dogs.

=== Qualification courses ===
- Parachute Course.
- Airborne Basic Course.
- Airborne Operations Course.
- Parachute Instructor Course.
- Free Fall Course.
- Operational Free Fall Course.
- Free Fall Instructor Course.
- Manual Jump Master Course.
- Pathfinder Course.
- Air Supply Instructor Course.
- Air Supply Inspector Course.
- Airborne Equipment Technic Course.
- Airborne Equipment and Parachutes Maintenance Course.
- Complementary Paratrooper Course (officers and sergeants).
- Complementary Paratrooper Course (soldiers).

== RPára organization ==
The RPára is made of the following units:

- Instruction Battalion: responsible for the forming of paratroopers. (Recruitment, Parachute course, Combat course, etc.)
- Aeroterrestrial Support Battalion:
  - Airborne Equipment Company
  - Airborne Supplying Company
  - Pathfinders Company
  - Airborne Activity Center
  - War Dogs Center
  - Engineers Platoon
  - Anti-aircraft artillery Platoon
  - Heavy Mortars Platoon
  - Anti-Tank Platoon
- Selection of Parachute Troops Center

== See also ==
- Airborne forces
- Portuguese Army
- Portuguese Air Force
- Portuguese Paratroop Nurses
