= Portuguese Paratroopers =

Parachute Troops
- Tropas Paraquedistas
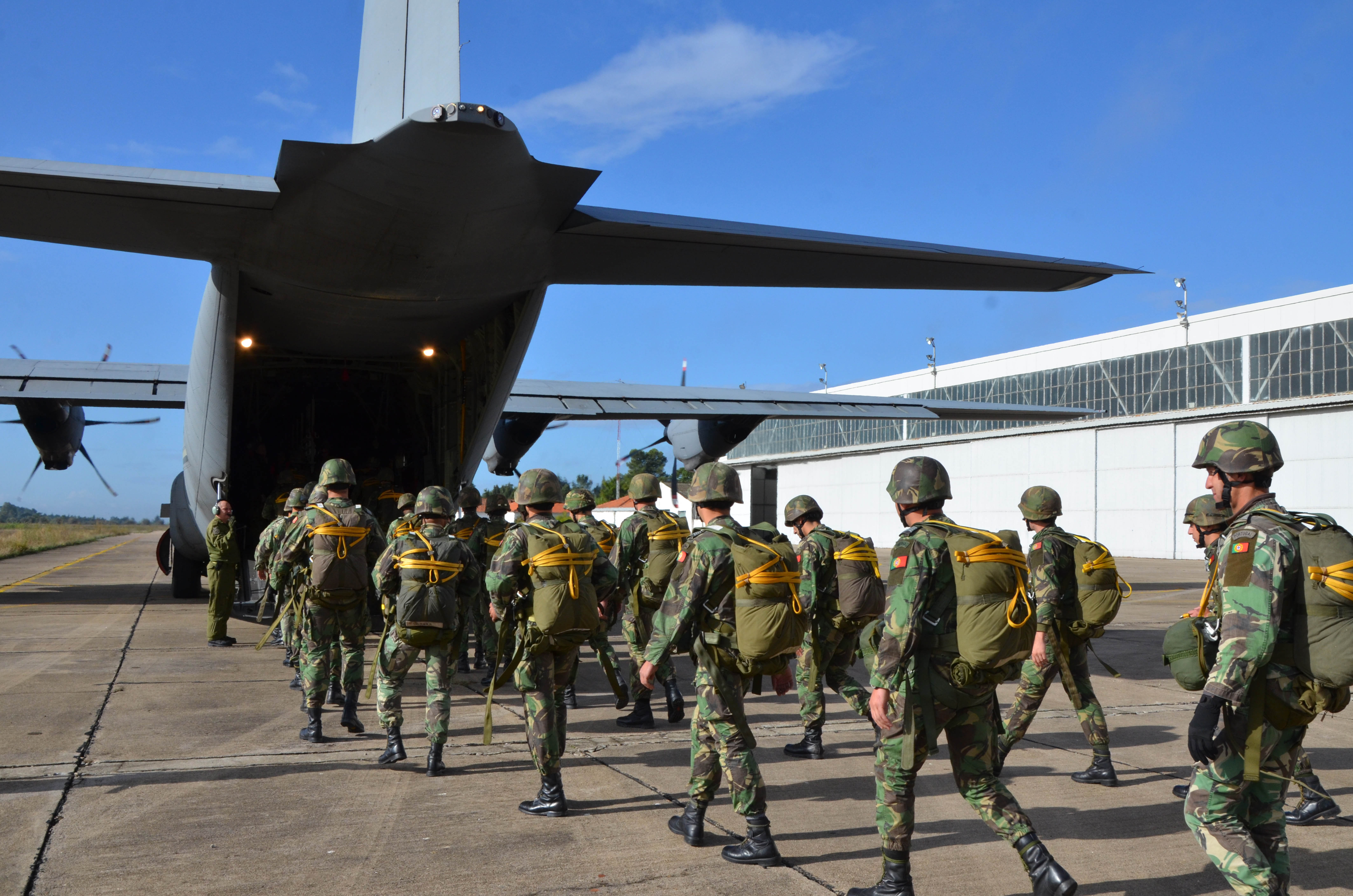
- Portuguese Paratroopers during NATO Trident Juncture 2015 exercise
- Active: 1956 – Present day
- Country: Portugal
- Branch: Portuguese Army
- Type: Paratrooper
- Part of: Rapid Reaction Brigade
- Nicknames: Paras; Boinas Verdes (Green Berets)
- Motto: Que nunca por vencidos se conheçam "May they never be known as defeated"

The Portuguese Paratroopers (Portuguese: Tropas Paraquedistas) are an elite infantry assault force, representing the bulk of the airborne forces of Portugal. They were created in 1956 as part of the Portuguese Air Force, being transferred to the Portuguese Army in 1993. Presently, most of the Paratroopers are part of the Portuguese Rapid Reaction Brigade which comprises all 3 special forces troops.

The Portuguese Paratroopers were usually nicknamed "Paras" or "Green Berets" (Boinas Verdes).

== Organization ==
Until 2006, the Portuguese Paratroopers formed an autonomous command within the Army, the Airborne Troops Command (Comandos de Tropas Aerotransportadas) or CTA. All parachute units and most of the Paratroopers were under that command. The CTA was also responsible for the selection of the future Paratroopers and for their training. The main operational formation of the CTA was the Independent Airborne Brigade (Brigada Aerotransportada Independente) or BAI. The CTA was created in 1993, when the Paratroopers were transferred to the Army, succeeding the Parachute Troops Command (Comando de Tropas Paraquedistas), that had the same functions within the Air Force.

The CTA was extinct in the Army reorganization of 2006, at the same time the BAI being transformed in the Rapid Reaction Brigade or BrigRR. Since then, the Paratroopers do not form a collective corps, constituting only a speciality of the Army. They serve mainly in the following units of the BrigRR (that now also includes non-parachute units):

- School of Parachute Troops (including the Air-Land Support Battalion and its Pathfinders Company);
- 1st Parachute Infantry Battalion / 15th Infantry Regiment;
- 2nd Parachute Infantry Battalion / 10th Infantry Regiment;

== History ==
=== The Parachute Rifle Battalion ===
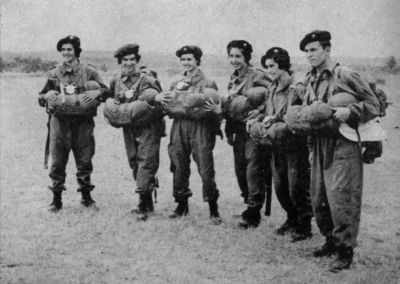
The first female paratrooper nurses and an instructor in 1961

The first Portuguese Paratroopers were a group of 12 Timorese soldiers trained in Australia in 1942, to participate in the fight against the Japanese forces that were occupying Portuguese Timor. Some of them were launched in the rearguard of the Japanese forces.

After the successful use of airborne forces in the Second World War by Germany and the Allies, other armed forces began to examine the possibility of forming parachute Troops for special missions. In 1955, the Portuguese Defense Minister approved a request for funds for airborne paratroop training. Two Portuguese Army captains went to France to take the French parachute course at the École des Troupes Aéroportées.

After the Portuguese Air Force was created as an independent service branch, it was decided that the Paratroopers would be part of the Air Force, much like the German organizational structure during World War II. The Parachute Rifle Battalion (Batalhão de Caçadores Páraquedistas) or BCP was formed in 1956. The Paratroopers were issued unique green berets and camo uniforms, being the first Portuguese military unit to wear these items of uniform. The Paratroopers initially jumped using the venerable German tri-motored Junkers Ju 52 aircraft.

The BCP was provisionally installed in the Carregueira Military Camp, near Lisbon, but soon it was moved to Tancos, which still serves today as the main base of the Portuguese Paratroopers.

=== The Parachute Rifles Regiment and the Overseas War ===
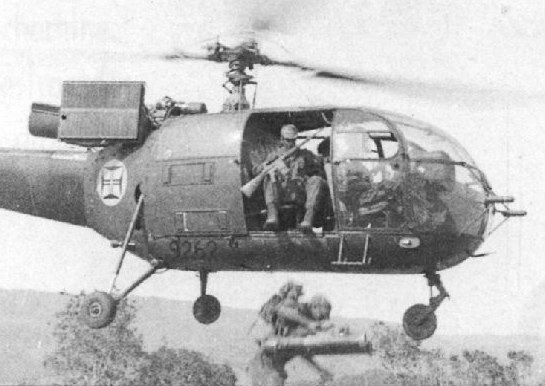
Paratroopers being launched from an Alouette III helicopter in an air-mobile assault in Angola in the early 1960s

In 1961, conflict erupted in the African colonies, which soon evolved into a series of guerrilla campaigns against Portuguese rule. The Paratroopers were then required to fight in Africa. The BCP was enlarged to become a regiment, as the Regimento de Caçadores Paraquedistas or RCP. It included an operational battalion (11th Paratroopers Rifles or BCP 11) and a training battalion. By this time, the men were armed with the modern 7,62mm ArmaLite AR-10 battle rifle, a weapon previously not seen in Western military forces. The paratroopers liked the accuracy and mobility of the AR-10, but supplies were embargoed after initial deliveries were completed in 1960, and paratroopers were later issued the collapsible-stock variant of the m/961 (G3) rifle. To fight the various separatist guerrilla movements, additional Paratroopers battalions were created in the Portuguese African territories of Angola, Guinea and Mozambique.

Due to Portuguese Air Force control over airborne units, the Paratroopers rifles battalions (BCP) numbers reflected their subordination to the several regional Air Force commands. So, the 1st Air Region (North Atlantic air command) commanded the BCP 11 based in European Portugal and the BCP 12 based in Portuguese Guinea, 2nd Air Region (South Atlantic air command) commanded the BCP 21 based in Angola and the 3rd Air Region (Indian Ocean air command) commanded the BCP 31 and BCP 32 both based in Mozambique.

In the War, the Portuguese Paratroopers suffered the following casualties:

- BCP 12: 56 dead (3 officers, 6 sergeants and 47 soldiers).
- BCP 21: 47 dead (5 officers, 9 sergeants and 33 soldiers)
- BCP 31: 39 dead (2 officers, 6 sergeants and 31 soldiers)
- BCP 32: 18 dead (2 sergeants and 16 soldiers)

A total of 160 Portuguese paratroopers were killed in action.

On April 25, 1974, a military coup led by left-wing members of the Portuguese Army ended the authoritarian government regime in Portugal, and the country moved towards fully democratic elections. Shortly afterwards, peace negotiations with the various African colonies resulted in an end to the African wars, followed by the independence of Angola, Mozambique, and Guinea-Bissau. Military reforms were instituted in Portugal in 1975, resulting in a reorganization of airborne forces.

=== The Parachute Troops Corps ===
In 1975, the Parachute Troops Corps (Corpo de Tropas Paraquedistas) or CTP is created within the Portuguese Air Force, to centralize the control of all its parachute units, under the command of a general officer.

On the 5 July 1975, to the CTP is given an organization consisting of a dual structure: fixed and dynamic. The so-called fixed structure would include fix bases designed to train and support the Parachute Troops. Within this structure, the following bases are created:

- No 1 Parachute Troops Operational Base (Base Operacional de Tropas Paraquedistas n.º 1) or BOTP 1, at Monsanto (Lisbon)
- No 2 Parachute Troops Operational Base or BOPT 2, at São Jacinto (Aveiro)
- Parachute Troops School Base (Base Escola de Tropas Paraquedistas) or BETP at Tancos.

A third operational base (BOTP 3) located within the Beja Airbase area was planned, but it was never activated. As part of this, the RCP was disbanded and transformed in the BETP within the CTP. The dynamic structure of the CTP would consist of its operational parachute units, the great majority of them being concentrated in the new Paratroopers Light Brigade (Brigada Ligeira de Páraquedistas) or BriParas. The BriParas organization included the following units:

- Paratroopers Battalion 11 (Batalhão de Paraquedistas n.º 11) or BP 11, at BOTP 1 (Monsanto)
- Paratroopers Battalion 21 or BP 21, at BOTP 2 (São Jacinto)
- Paratroopers Battalion 31 or BP 31, at BETP (Tancos)
- Air-Land Operational Group, at BETP (Tancos)
- Service Support Operational Group, at BOTP 2 (São Jacinto)
- Anti-Tank Company, at BOTP 1 (Monsanto)
- Signals Company, at BOTP 1 (Monsanto)
- Heavy Mortar Company, at BOTP 2 (São Jacinto)

The CTP was responsible for changing the Paratroopers from a counter-guerrilla force to a conventional airborne force capable of fighting in a possible NATO vs Warsaw Pact war.

=== Army integration ===
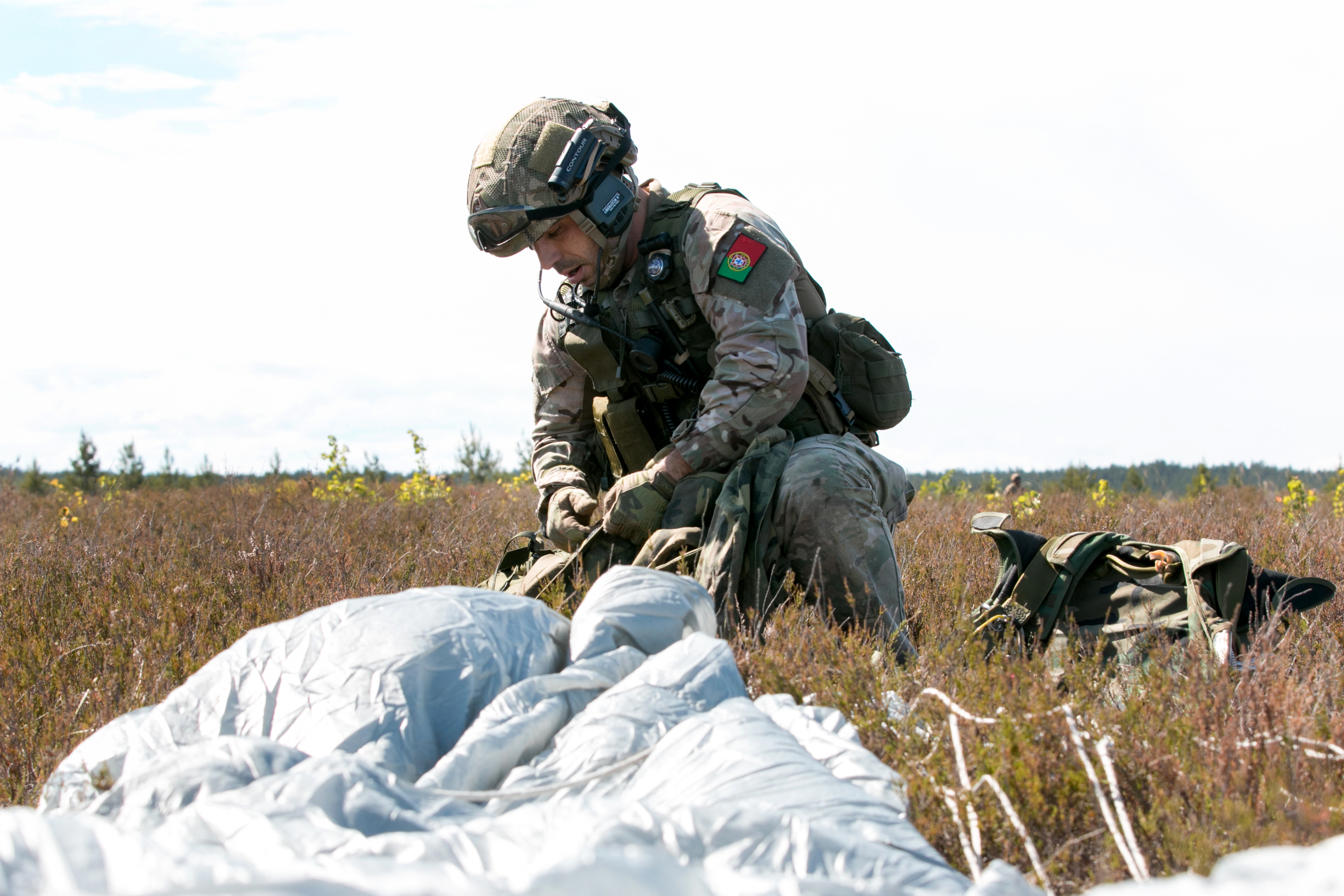
Paratroopers after conducting a high altitude low opening (HALO) jump in multinational airborne training (2018)

In 1993, further changes in the organization of airborne forces took place when the Defense Minister decided that the entire corps should leave the Portuguese Air Force and become part of the Portuguese Army. This meant also that the Army Commandos Regiment would be disbanded and the commandos that had taken the parachute course would be part of the new airborne brigade which was named Brigada Aerotransportada Independente (Independent Airborne Brigade) or BAI.

The BETP then changed its name again to Escola de Tropas Aerotransportadas (Airborne Troops School) or ETAT, the Parachute Troops Corps changed to the Comando de Tropas Aerotransportadas (Airborne Troops Command) and all three Paratrooper battalions changed to Airborne infantry battalions (Batalhão de Infantaria Aerotransportada; BIAT). This new Army Airborne Brigade meant to be larger and more powerful than the previous Air Force Paratroopers Light Brigade. As part of its strengthening, the new brigade received 105 mm guns (replacing the heavy mortars as its main artillery) and wheeled armored vehicles.

In territorial terms, the BOTP 1 was closed (still under the Air Force) and BOTP 2 changed its name to São Jacinto Military Area. The units of the brigade that were not at Tancos (Airborne Support Battalion) or São Jacinto (2nd BIAT) were now garrisoned at Army barracks (Regiments) like the 15th Infantry Regiment at Tomar (1st BIAT), 3rd Infantry Regiment at Beja (3rd BIAT), 4th Artillery Regiment at Leiria (Grupo de Artilharia de Campanha – Field Artillery Battalion), 3rd Cavalry Regiment at Estremoz (Esquadrão de Reconhecimento Aerotransportado – Armoured Recon Squadron) and others.

The BAI structure was:

- 1st Airborne Infantry Battalion, at the 15th Infantry Regiment
- 2nd Airborne Infantry Battalion, at the São Jacinto Military Area
- 3rd Airborne Infantry Battalion, at the 3rd Infantry Regiment
- Anti-Tank Company, at the São Jacinto Military Area
- Air-Land Support Battalion, at the ETAT
- Field Artillery Battalion, at the 4th Artillery Regiment
- Signals Company, at the Tancos Military Airfield
- Engineering Company, at the Engineering Practical School
- Armored Reconnaissance Squadron, at the 3rd Cavalry Regiment
- Anti-Aircraft Artillery Battery, at the 1st Anti-Aircraft Artillery Regiment
- Service Support Battalion, at the 15th Infantry Regiment

It was envisaged that all BAI be fully staffed by paratrooper qualified personnel, including its combat support and service support units. However, due to various difficulties, this objective was never fully achieved. Moreover, it was never possible to maintain the 3rd BIAT continuously active, this unit being inactive much of the time.

In November 2007, a Paratrooper was killed in a vehicle accident in Afghanistan.

=== Rapid Reaction Brigade ===
The last reorganization of the Army though, changed the ETAT designation again to ETP – Escola de Tropas Paraquedistas (School of Parachute Troops) with the BAI being renamed and reorganized as BRR – Brigada de Reacção Rápida . The Airborne Troops Command was disbanded. Currently, airborne forces are under direct control of regular army commands, such as Land Forces Operational Command (operational units) or the Instruction Command (ETP – Paratrooper School).

The Elite Forces brigade is no longer a full deployable brigade, but rather an organizational structure that controls all the special trained army units.

The 3rd Airborne Infantry Battalion and Anti-Tank Company were disbanded and the other two BIAT were renamed Paratrooper Infantry Battalions (BIParas), the São Jacinto Military Area was renamed 10th Infantry Regiment, the Airborne Artillery Group and the Services and Support Battalion were transferred to the Intervention Brigade and their no longer Airborne capable and the Engineering Company and the Anti-Aircraft Artillery Battery were reduced to platoon size. This new Rapid Reaction Brigade joined all remaining Paratrooper units together with Army Special Operations and the reborn battalion-size Army Commandos unit. Finally a newly formed unit has joined BRR: UALE (Army Light Aviation Unit), which is waiting to be equipped with NH-90 TTH and a still-to-be-chosen light utility helicopter, possibly the Eurocopter EC-135 or the AgustaWestland AW109.

BRR forces include:

- 15th Infantry Regiment: 1st BIPara
- 10th Infantry Regiment: 2nd BIPara
- ETP: Aeroterrestrial Battalion
- Commandos Troop Center: Commando Battalion
- Special Operations Troop Center: Special Operations Forces
- Army Light Aviation Unit: Army Helicopter Group, Signals Company
- 3rd Cavalry Regiment: Recon Squadron
- Engineering Practical School: Engineering Platoon
- 1st Anti-Aircraft Artillery Regiment: Air Defence Platoon

== Candidate selection and training ==
=== General conditions ===
- A volunteer
- A Portuguese citizen
- At least 18 years old and 24 at the most for enlisted ranks
- Psycho-physically and physically fit
- Minimum height is 1.60m for males and 1.56m for females
- Clean criminal registry
- Minimum school grade required is the 9th for enlisted, 12th for NCOs and a college degree to officers

=== Admission tests ===
- Medical exams
- Sensorial exams
- Psychiatric and physical exams
- Biographic questionnaire
- Psychological interview
- Physical tests

=== Training courses in the ETP ===
- Basic Instruction.
- Complementary Instruction.
  - Pathfinder Auxiliary Course.
  - Parachute Maintenance Course.
  - Air Supply Operator Course.
  - Trainer of Military dogs.

=== Qualification Courses ===
- Parachute Course.
- Airborne Basic Course.
- Airborne Operations Course.
- Parachute Instructor Course.
- Free Fall Course.
- Operational Free Fall Course.
- Free Fall Instructor Course.
- Manual Jump Master Course.
- Pathfinder Course.
- Air Supply Instructor Course.
- Air Supply Inspector Course.
- Airborne Equipment Technic Course.
- Airborne Equipment and Parachutes Maintenance Course.
- Complementary Paratrooper Course (officers and sergeants).
- Complementary Paratrooper Course (soldiers).

== Equipment ==
Infantry equipment

- Glock 17 Gen 5
- Heckler & Koch MP5
- FN SCAR L
- FN SCAR H
- FN Minimi Mk3
- Browning M2HB
- Carl Gustav M3
- MILAN
- FIM-92 Stinger
- Heckler & Koch GMG
- Mk 19 grenade launcher

Armoured vehicles

- URO VAMTAC ST5

Aircraft

- Embraer C-390 Millennium (Portuguese Air Force)
- Lockheed C-130 Hercules (Portuguese Air Force)
- EADS CASA C-295 (Portuguese Air Force)

== See also ==
- Portuguese Paratroop Nurses
- School of Parachute Troops
