= Isabel Rilvas =

Portuguese pilot and parachutist (1935–2025)

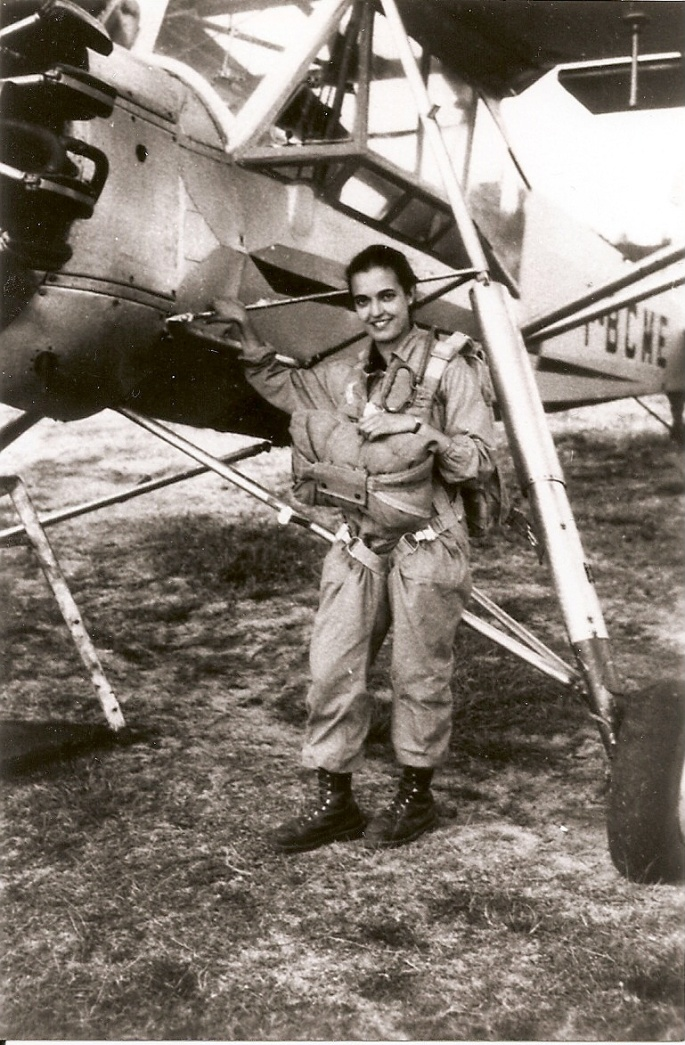
- Born: Isabel Manuela Teixeira Bandeira de Melo; 8 January 1935; Lisbon, Portugal
- Died: 14 September 2025 (aged 90)
- Occupation: Acrobatic pilot
- Known for: Inspiration for the founding of the Portuguese Paratroop Nurses

Isabel Manuela Teixeira Bandeira de Melo (8 January 1935 – 14 September 2025), also known as Isabel Rilvas, was a Portuguese acrobatic pilot, known for being the first female parachutist in Portugal and the inspiration for the creation of the Portuguese Paratroop Nurses. She was the first acrobatic pilot in the Iberian Peninsula, broke the Portuguese record for flight without an engine, and was the first Portuguese person to obtain a hot-air balloon license.

== Early life ==
Rilvas was born on 8 January 1935, in the Portuguese capital of Lisbon. She was the daughter of the Count of Rilvas, hence the surname by which she became known.

== Flying career ==
Rilvas began to learn to fly at the Civil Aviation School of the Aero Club of Portugal in the Sintra municipality in 1953, sponsored by the director of the General Aeronautical Material Workshops (OGMA), Pedro Avilez. To take the course, she was always accompanied by a family employee who acted as her companion. She obtained her licence as a private airplane pilot in 1954, later obtaining the equivalent licences in South Africa, Spain, Italy and the US, countries where she lived as the wife of Leonardo Mathias, who was the Portuguese ambassador.

Rilvas became the first acrobatic pilot in the Iberian Peninsula and, in 1955, only the second Portuguese woman to obtain a C licence that allowed her to fly gliders. As an acrobatic pilot she entered several competitions at Sintra and Figueira da Foz, piloting various makes of planes including a Cessna, the Tiger Moth, and the Piper PA-12 Super Cruiser. She won competitions in 1958 and 1960.

As a glider pilot, Rilvas broke the Portuguese record for staying in the air without an engine, remaining aloft for 11 hours and 15 minutes, around the OGMA airfield at Alverca do Ribatejo on 2 July 1960. She was also a pioneer in ballooning, becoming the first Portuguese woman to obtain a Hot Air Balloon certificate in 1981, in the USA.

== Paratroop nurses ==
In 1955, Rilvas went to France to take a parachuting course at Biscarrosse Parachuting Centre. While attending an air festival at Le Bourget she met the Paratroop Nurses of the French Red Cross, who encouraged her to take the idea back to Portugal. In 1956, she obtained the 1st degree brevet in civil parachuting at the Biscarrosse Parachuting Center. In 1957, she obtained the 2nd degree brevet in the same school. Lieutenant-Colonel Kaúlza de Arriaga, then sub-State Secretary of Aeronautics, supported Rilvas's idea for a Portuguese Paratroop Nurse service and started to explore the possibilities of its integration in the Armed Forces.

In order to maintain her licences, Rilvas had to complete a specific number of jumps, but was faced with the lack of places where it was possible to do so in Portugal. For this reason, she asked the Portuguese Air Force to authorize her to jump at the Tancos military base, where the Paratroopers' Regiment was based. On 16 January 1957 she was the first civilian to jump at Tancos. She was also the first person to jump in Luanda in Angola and in Lourenço Marques (now Maputo) in Mozambique.

In 1961, Kaúlza de Arriaga, at the beginning of the Portuguese Colonial War, presented the idea of paratroop nurses to the Portuguese leader António de Oliveira Salazar, who authorized the creation of a group. In June of that year, training was given to 11 nurses at the Tancos base, of which six obtained a licence, becoming known as the Seis Marias. From the beginning of the war until the end of 1974, the corps of paratroop nurses made evacuations of soldiers and civilians in the then Portuguese colonies, assisted wounded in combat zones, and worked in several hospitals both in Portugal and in the colonies, namely in Luanda, Lourenço Marques, Nampula, Terceira Island in the Azores, and Lisbon.

== Death ==
Rilvas died on 14 September 2025, at the age of 90. She had celebrated her 90th birthday in January of that year with a skydive, together with an instructor.

== Awards ==
- 1994: Rilvas was made a Dame of the Order of Malta.
- 1999: She was awarded the Cross Pro Mérito Melitense of the Order of Malta.
- 1999: Her name, with the phrase "for exceptional contributions to aviation", was engraved on a granite stone in the Memory Lane of the International Forest of Friendship, in Kansas (USA) at the foot of the tree dedicated to Portugal.
- 2000: A plaque with her name was placed on the Wall of Wings of the 99s Museum of Women Pilots, in Oklahoma City (USA).
- 2002: Rilvas was made a Dame Grand Cross of the Royal Order of Saint Isabel.
- 2005: She was the first and only Portuguese woman to receive the Paul Tissandier Diploma awarded by the World Air Sports Federation, of which she has been a member since 1958.
- 2014: She was decorated by the Portuguese Air Force with the First-Class Aeronautical Merit Medal.
- 2017: Rilvas was awarded the rank of Grand Officer of the Order of Prince Henry of Portugal.
