= Castle of Almourol =

Medieval castle in Praia do Ribatejo, Portugal

- Castelo de Almourol
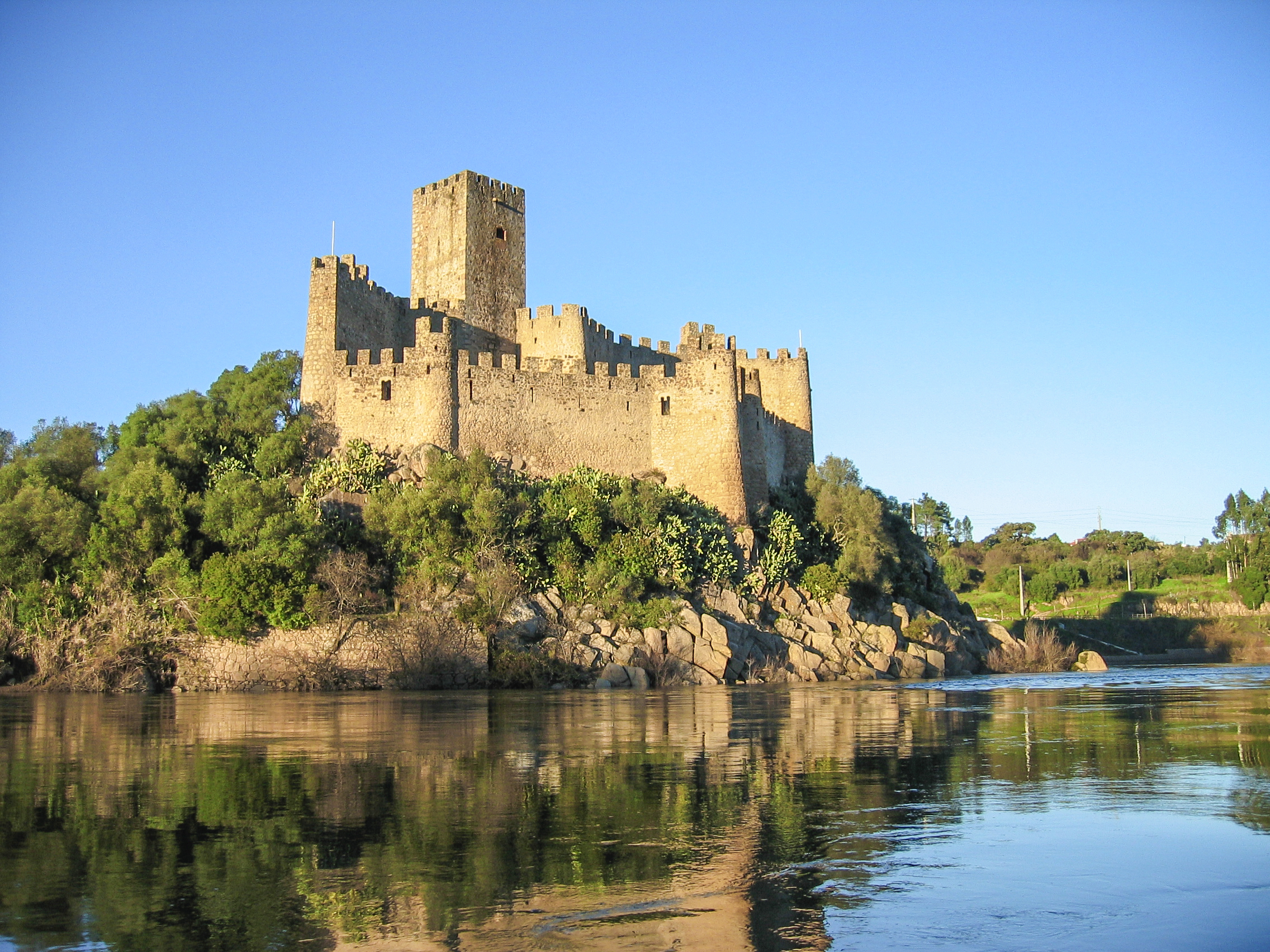
- An image of the castle from the narrow channel that separates the islet of Almourol on the Tagus River
- Interactive map of the Castle of Almourol area
- Alternative names: Almourol

General information
- Type: Castle
- Location: Vila Nova da Barquinha, Médio Tejo, Centre
- Coordinates: 39°27′43″N 8°23′1.79″W
- Year built: 11 Years
- Completed: fl. 1171
- Owner: Portuguese Republic

Technical details
- Material: Granite masonry

Design and construction
- Architect: D. Gualdim Pais

Website
- https://welcome-to.pt/castelo-de-almourol/

The Castle of Almourol is a medieval castle atop the islet of Almourol in the middle of the Tagus River, located in the civil parish of Praia do Ribatejo, 4 kilometres (2.5 mi) from the municipal seat of Vila Nova da Barquinha, in Portugal's Oeste e Vale do Tejo region. The castle was part of the defensive line controlled by the Knights Templar, and a stronghold used during the Portuguese Reconquista.

== History ==
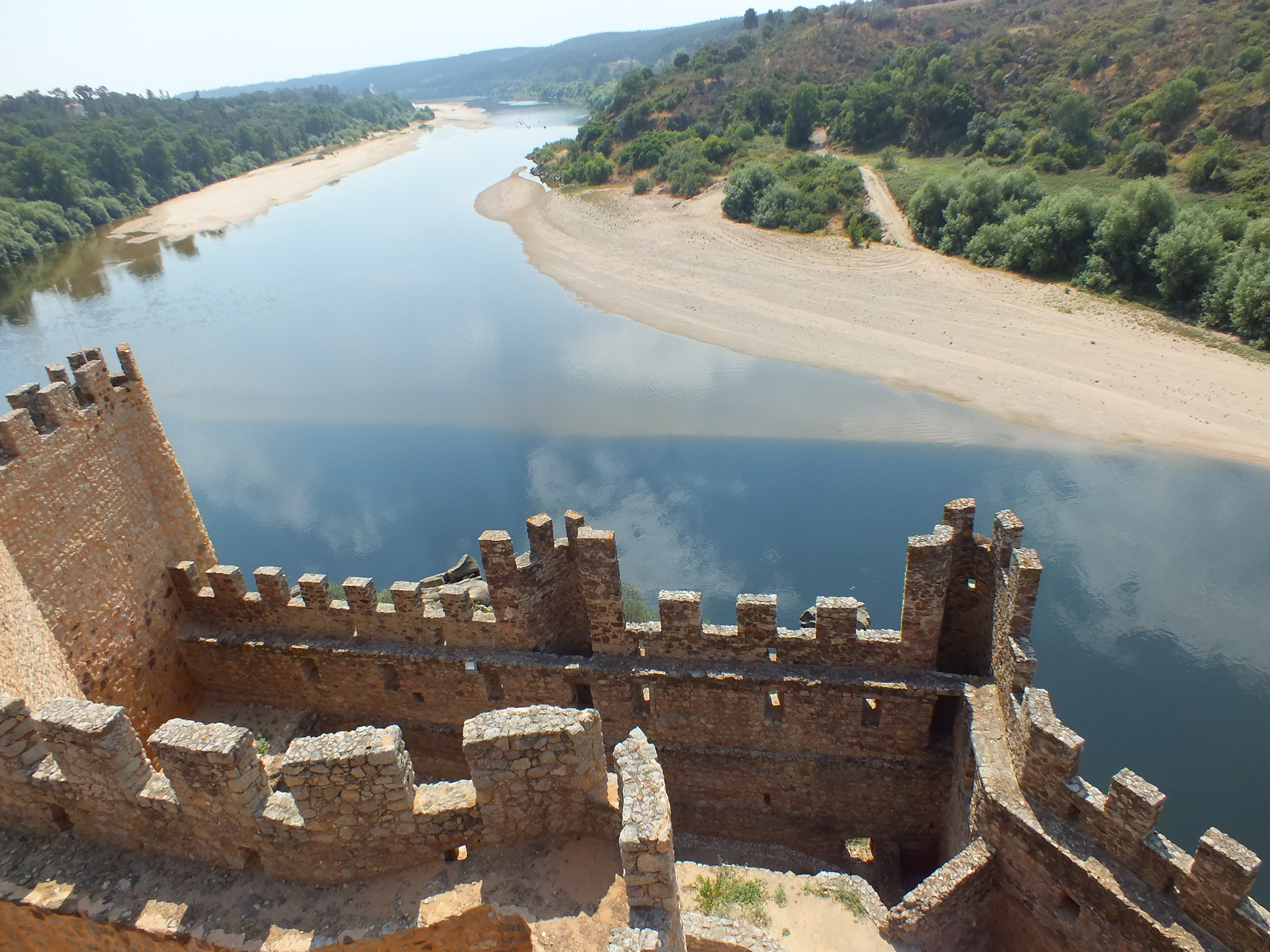
A view of the Tagus River from the castle, showing the granite outcropping and its 18-metre rise over the waterway.

It is believed that the castle was constructed on the site of a primitive Lusitanian castro that was later conquered by the Romans during the 1st century B.C.E. It was later remodeled by successive invading forces, including the Alans, Visigoths and the Arabs, although it is unclear when the present castle was established. In excavations carried out in the interior and exterior enclosures, various vestiges of Roman occupation were discovered including coins, millennium markers, and Roman foundations, while medieval remnants such as medallions and two marble columns were also discovered in the castle's vicinity.

The castle of Almourol is one of the more emblematic medieval military monuments of the Reconquista, and one of the best representations of the influence of the Knights Templar in Portugal. When it was conquered in 1129 by forces loyal to the Portuguese nobility, it was known as Almorolan, and placed in the trust of Gualdim Pais, the master of the Knights Templar in Portugal, who subsequently rebuilt the structure. The structure was reconstructed, starting in 1171 (from an inscription over the principal gate) and restored during the subsequent reigns.

Losing its strategic place, the castle was abandoned and fell into ruin. In the 19th century, it was "reinvented" by idealistic romanticists, which eventually led to interventions in the 1940s and 1950s and adaptation of the castle to an "Official Residence" of the Portuguese Republic. During this period, there were many restorations that transformed the physical appearance of the structure, including the addition of crenellations and bartizans.

The Direcção-Geral dos Edifícios e Monumentos Nacionais ("Directorate-General of Buildings and National Monuments"), a forerunner of the current Direção-Geral do Património Cultural, first intervened on the site in 1939, constructing the chemin de ronde in masonry and reinforced concrete, dismantling and reconstructing a corner of the keep, repairing and consolidating the battlements (including demolition of the alure of the tower), reconstructing a brick vault under the existing, and reconstructing the interior pavement in small stone.

Around 1940-1950, spaces of the castle were adapted for its use as an official residence of the Portuguese Republic. At the end of this short term, the building's furniture was acquired by the Comissão para a Aquisição de Mobiliário ("Commission for Furniture Acquisition") in 1955, and an electrical system was installed.

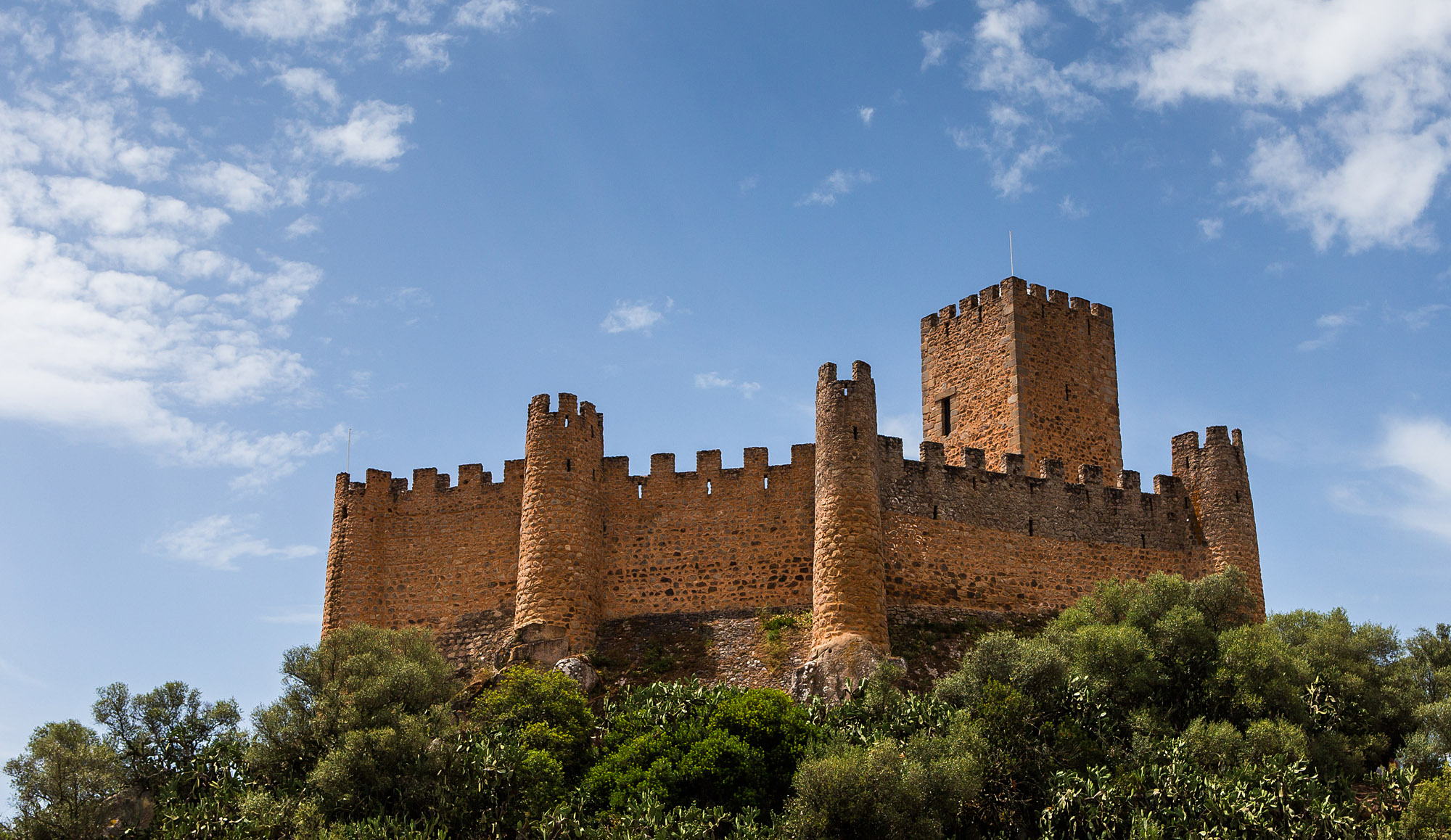
The semi-circular battlements and allures that skirt the inner enclosure and the main keep.

Between 1958 and 1959, the keep was somewhat consolidated with concrete straps, a separate project diminished the permeability of the courtyard, the Escola Prática de Engenharia ("Practical School of Engineering") reconstructed the interior walls of the tower, and a door (including doorposts and lintels) was reconstructed. Other projects followed: in 1959, the façade of one section of the wall was repaired; in 1960, with the conclusion of the repairs to the exterior walls, the Direcção da Arma de Engenharia de Tancos ("Tancos Directorate for the Engineering Arm") improved the pavement and road access. The Serviços de Engenharia do Estado Maior do Exército ("Army General Staff Engineering Services") reconstructed a roadway that skirted the islet from the quay to the southern end of the castle.

By 1996, the walls had been repaired, sections of the keep preserved, and the pavement within the castle restored.

=== 21st century and tourism ===
By 2004, the castle began to show new signs of degradation resulting from water infiltration, including in a few of the exterior walls.

Although access to the National Monument and fluvial islet is free, visitors to the structure must pay for an inexpensive boat ride across the river, the only way for them to reach the castle.

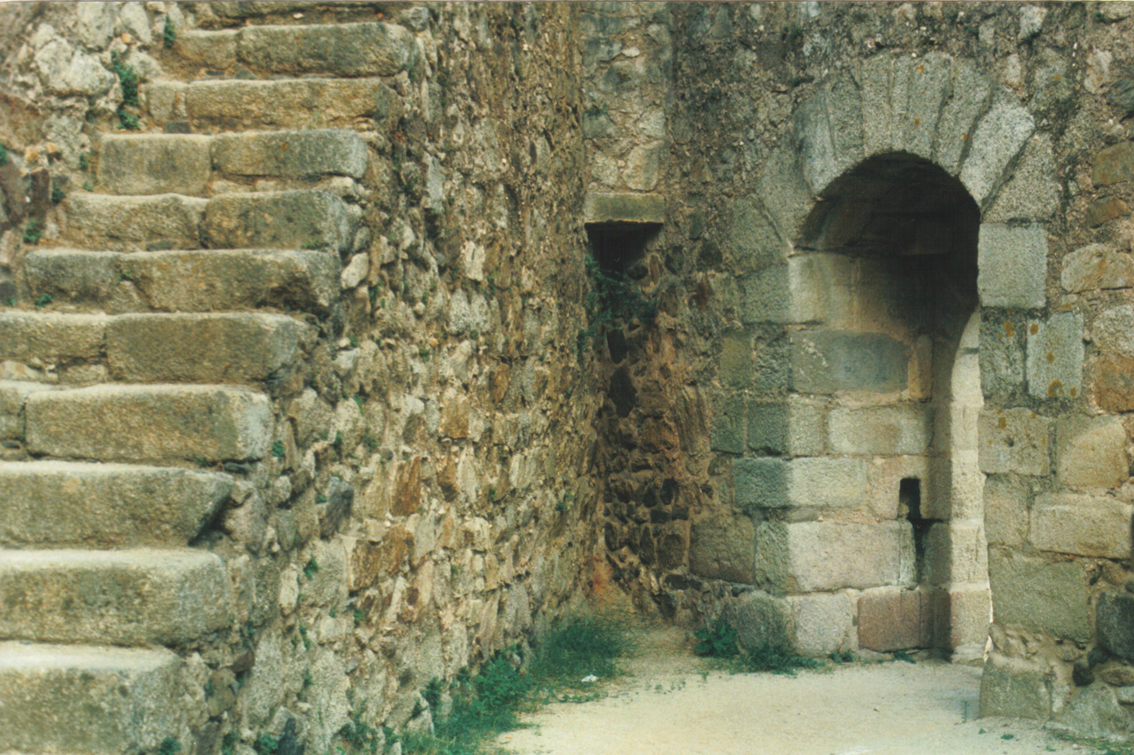
The main gate/door (viewed from the interior) showing access to the allures.

== Architecture ==
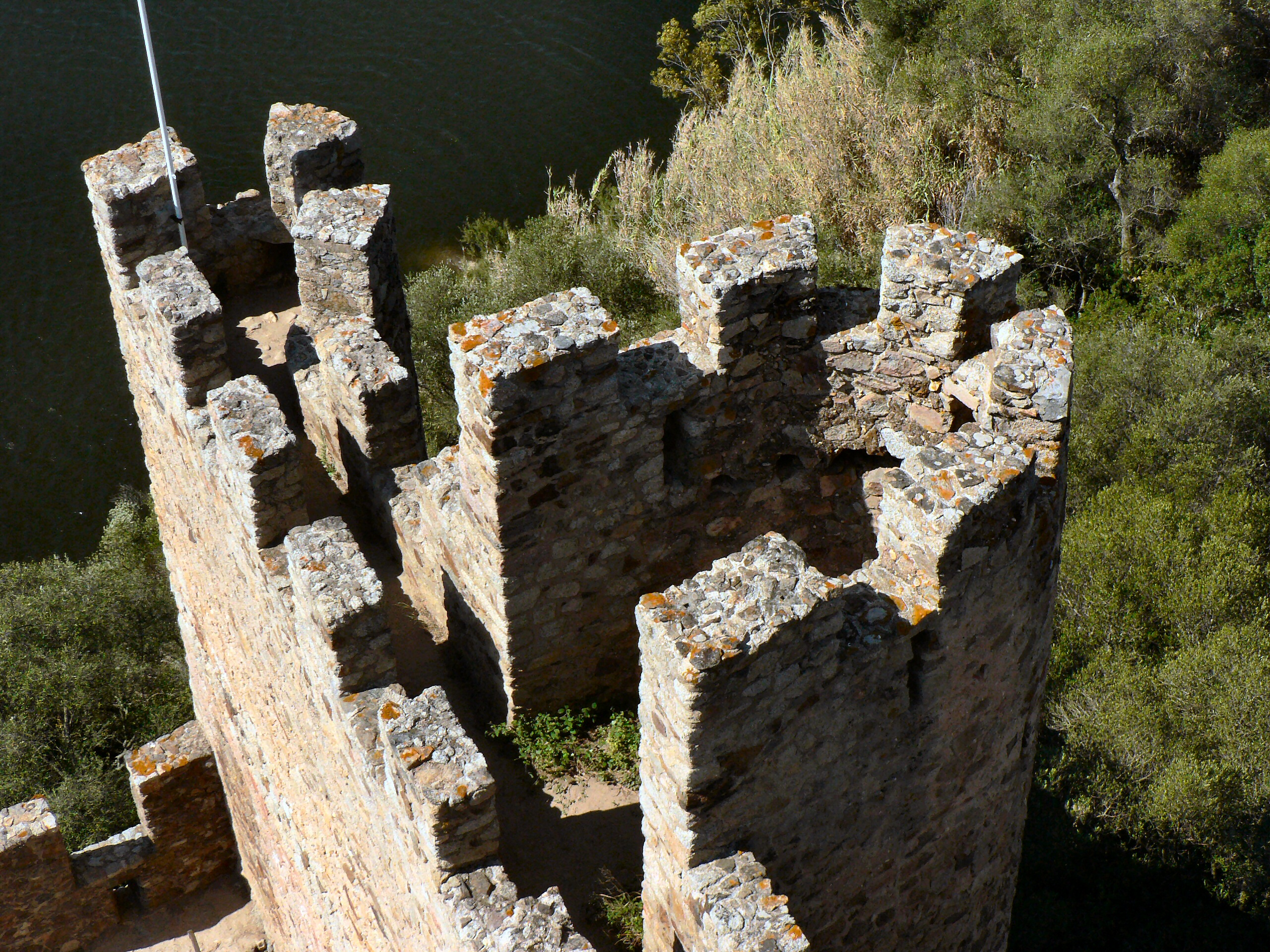
Example of the crenellations of the outer enclosure

The castle rises over a granite outcropping 18 metres (59 ft) in height and is approximately 310 metres (1,020 ft) long and 75 metres (246 ft) wide, in the middle of the Tagus River waterway, a few metres below its confluence with the Zêzere River in front of the town of Tancos.

The castle has an irregular rectangular plan consisting of two enclosures: an exterior lower level faces upstream with a traitors' gate and walls reinforced by nine tall circular towers; while the interior enclosure, located at a higher elevation, has walls accessible by the main gate to the main keep. The keep is three stories tall and includes the original pads that supported the main truss. The remaining sentry towers are irregular, owing to the irregular terrain. The keep is actually an innovation at this castle, appearing in the 12th century after the Castle of Tomar, the principal defensive redoubt of the Templars in Portugal. Similarly, the watchtowers were innovations brought into the western Iberian peninsula by the Templars, and applied in Almourol.

The interior is bisected by several masonry doorways that link the different parts of the castle. Two inscription stones mark the castle's history and its re-edification by Gualdim Pais (over the main gate), as well as its Christian history (from the cross carved into the space above an open window in the keep).

== See also ==
- How to visit? (English page)
- Castles in Portugal
- Monuments of Portugal
- History of Portugal
- Order of Christ
