= Moron (ancient city) =

City in ancient Portugal

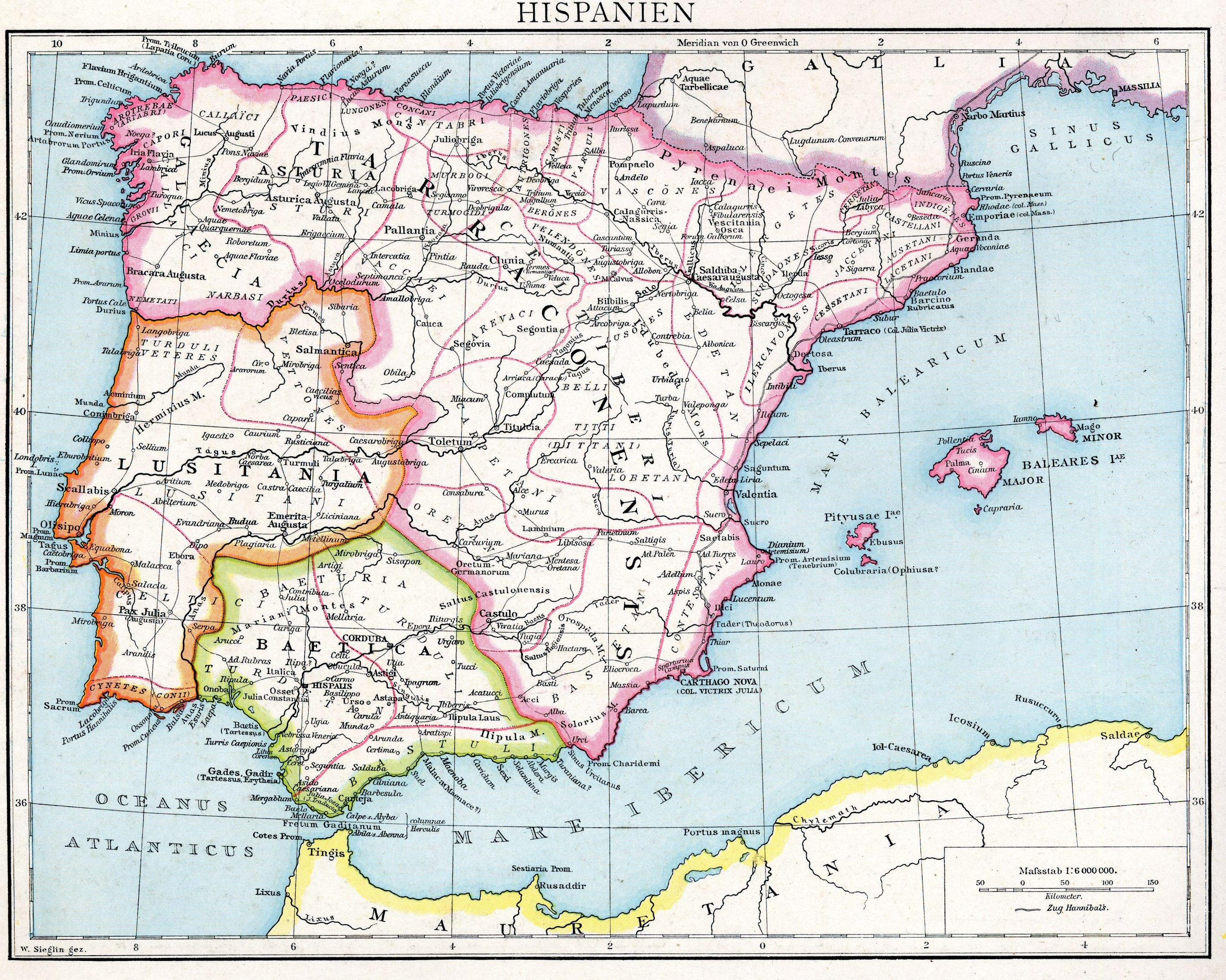
Roman provinces of Hispania map, showing Moron south of Scallabis (Gustav Droysen, 1886).

Moron was an ancient city mentioned by Strabo. Several hypotheses exist related to its location, but a location in Lusitania, near Scallabis (modern day Santarém) is strongly considered.

Strabo mentions that Decimus Junius Brutus Callaicus made camp on an island near the city possibly identified as modern Almourol on the river Tagus.

Another hypothesis points to Alpiarça.
