= Rapid Reaction Brigade (Portugal) =

Portuguese Army Rapid Reaction Brigade
- Portuguese: Brigada de Reacção Rápida
- Active: 1993–present
- Country: Portugal
- Branch: Army
- Type: Airborne Light Infantry; Special Forces
- Size: Eight Battalions
- Part of: Portuguese Army
- Garrison/HQ: Parachute Troops School, Tancos
- Motto: Portuguese: Se fizeram por armas tão svbidos
- Engagements: Bosnia; Kosovo; East-Timor; Afghanistan; Iraq; Mali; Central African Republic

Commanders
- Current commander: MG Raul Luís de Morais Lima Ferreira da Cunha

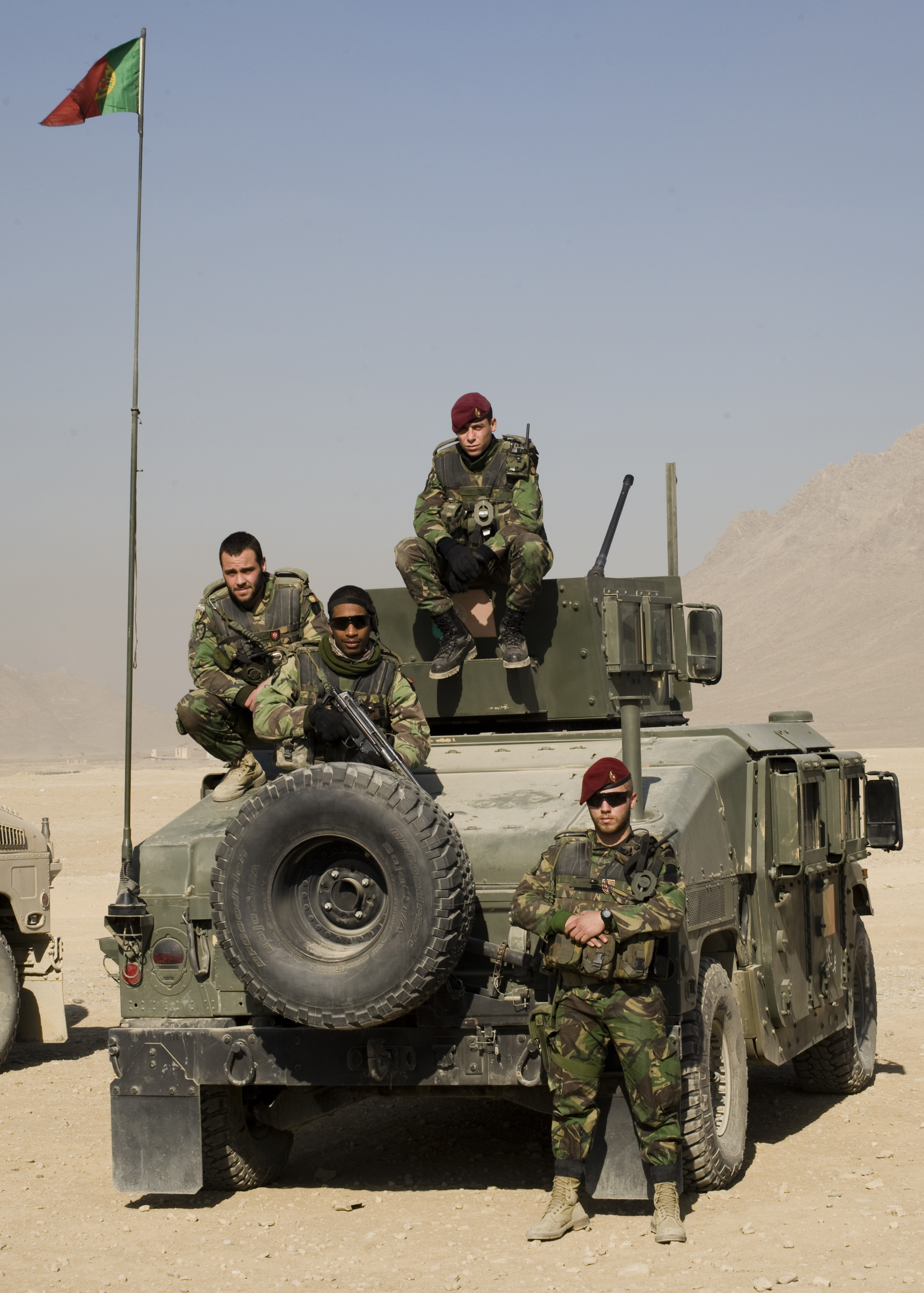
Portuguese Commandos in Afghanistan

The Rapid Reaction Brigade (Portuguese: Brigada de Reacção Rápida) is a unit of the Portuguese Army. It was known as Brigada Aerotransportada Independente (Independent Airborne Brigade) until 2006. Its different units are highly trained Paratroopers, Commandos and Special Operations Troops capable of responding to threats in any part of continental Portugal or any other Portuguese overseas territory with quick deployment by air, sea or land (with the support of the Air Force and/or the Navy when required). This brigade is the most requested by the Portuguese Government to fulfill international assignments due to its experience and multi-role capability.

The economic crisis forced the Portuguese Government to make budget cuts in the Armed Forces, and in June 2012 it was announced that the Portuguese Army was no longer going to receive the 10 NH-90 transport helicopters that would incorporate the Unidade de Aviação Ligeira do Exército (Army Light Aviation Unit). Thus, the Rapid Reaction Brigade still maintains its dependency on the Air Force for aerial transportation.

== History ==
In 1993, the Corpo de Tropas Aerotransportadas (Airborne Troops Corps), which was part of the Portuguese Air Force was disbanded and the Portuguese airborne forces were transferred to the Army. A new brigade was then created, the Independent Airborne Brigade (BAI) which included all airborne-capable forces in it. The Army also transferred to this brigade some heavier weapons like howitzers, thus giving the unit increased firepower, as well as creating an operational command named Comando de Tropas Aerotransportadas (Airborne Troops Command). The Comandos Regiment was disbanded and the Comandos that had the Parachute Course were transferred to the new brigade. For more than 10 years the BAI kept serving the country in international missions, sending Paratroopers to several locations in Europe and East-Timor. In 2002 the Comandos were reactivated as an independent unit and were separated from the Paratroopers.

In 2006, a reorganization in the Portuguese Army occurred, renaming the brigade as Brigada de Reacção Rápida (Rapid Reaction Brigade) and adding special forces to it. These units were the Comandos and the Rangers, increasing the brigade-size with two Comando companies and the Special Operations Forces but losing the 3rd Paratrooper Infantry Battalion (disbanded). Also, this reformation had its costs since the 155mm howitzers were transferred to the Portuguese Intervention Brigade (thus losing its airborne capability) and the Airborne Troops Command was disbanded, putting the unit under the orders of the Comando Operacional de Forças Terrestres (Land Forces Operational Command) losing its autonomy from the rest of the Army.

== Organization ==
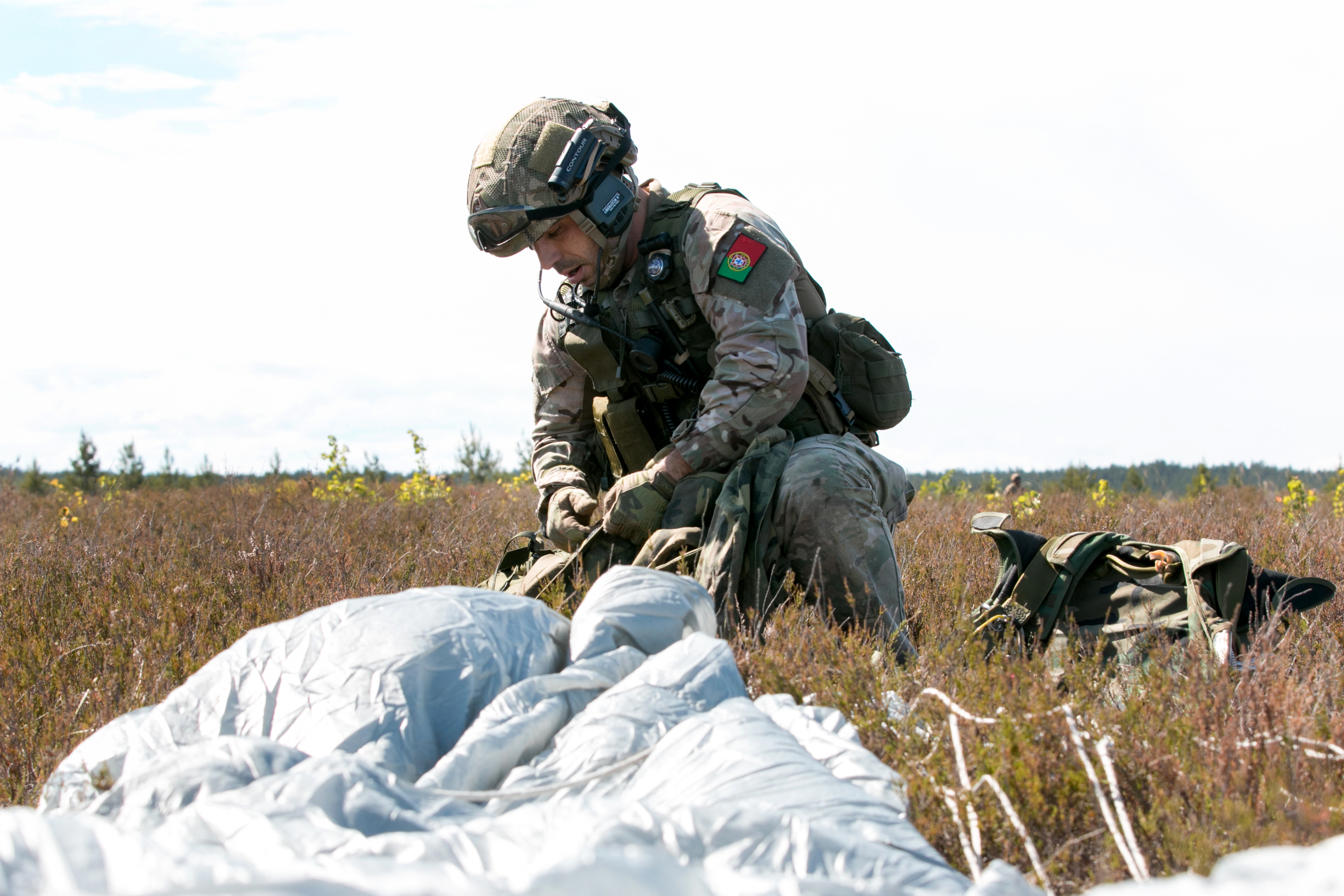
Portuguese soldiers conduct Halo Jump during Saber Strike 18 in Latvia.

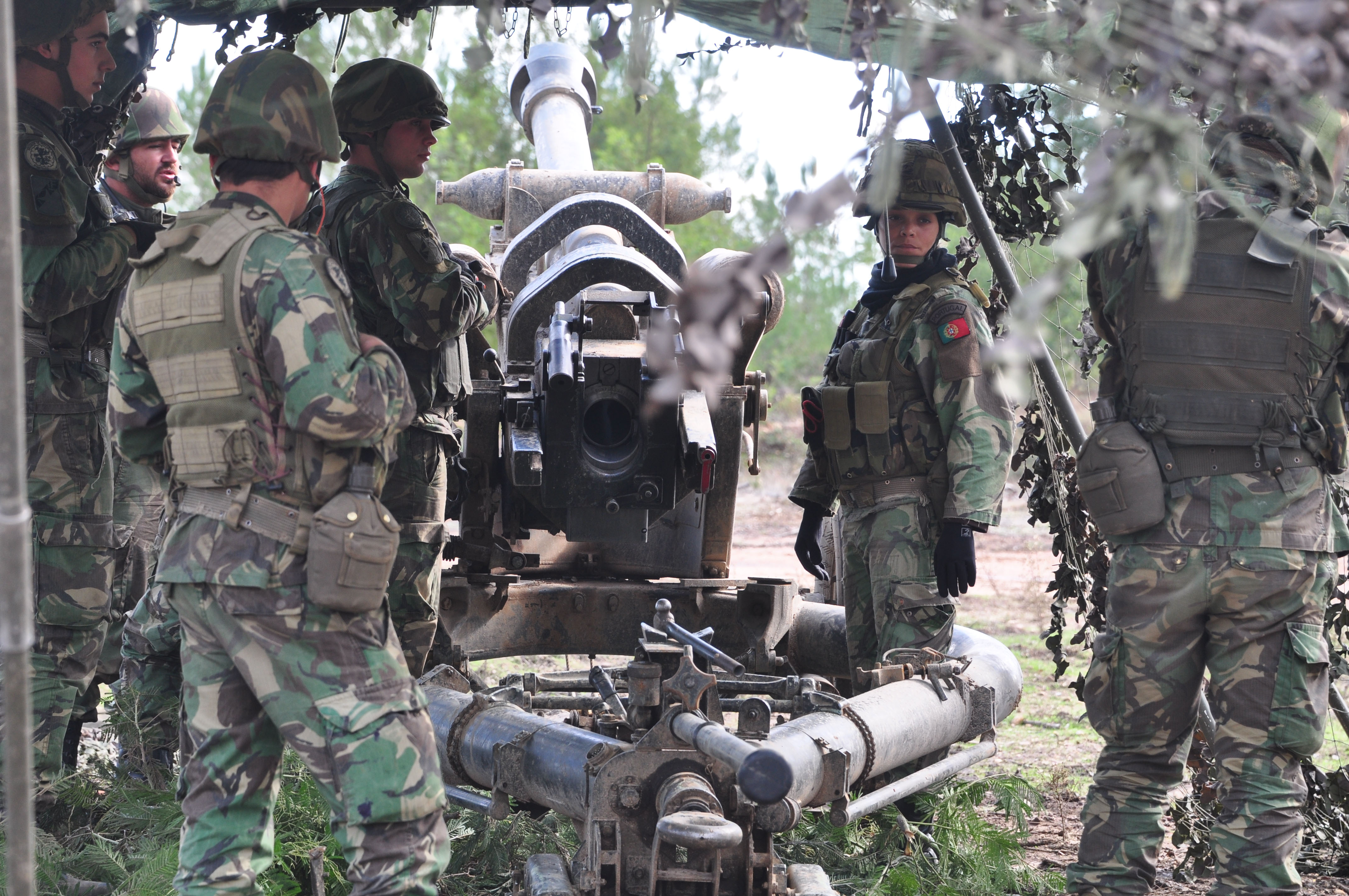
Field artillery unit of the Portuguese Army's Rapid Reaction Brigade of the 4th Artillery Regiment

The brigade's operational units are listed below. Under the Portuguese system regiments and centres are responsible for the training, maintenance, and sustainment of the operational units, but are not operational units themselves. I.e. the 15th Infantry Regiment trains, maintains and sustains the 1st Paratroopers Infantry Battalion, but itself is not an operational unit and not part of the brigade during wartime.

- Rapid Reaction Brigade (Brigada de Reação Rápida), in Tancos
  - Command and Services Company (Companhia de Comando e Serviços), in Tancos
  - Cavalry Regiment No. 3 (Regimento de Cavalaria N.º 3), in Estremoz
    - Information, Surveillance, Target Acquisition and Reconnaissance Group (Agrupamento de Informações, Vigilância, Aquisição de Objetivos e Reconhecimento) (ISTAR Group)
      - Command and Services Company (Companhia de Comando e Serviços)
      - Reconnaissance Squadron (Esquadrão de Reconhecimento)
      - C2 Intelligence Fusion Company (Companhia de C2 Intelligence Fusion)
      - HUMINT/Counter-Intelligence Platoon (Pelotão HUMINT/Counter-Intelligence)
      - Surveillance Systems Company (Companhia de Sistemas de Vigilância), in Vendas Novas (in peacetime part of the Artillery Regiment No. 5, Intervention Brigade)
      - Electronic Warfare Company (Companhia de Guerra Eletrónica), in Porto (in peacetime part of the Signal Regiment)
      - Geospatial Support Unit (Unidade de Apoio Geoespacial), in Lisbon (in peacetime part of the Army Geospatial Information Center)
  - Infantry Regiment No. 1 (Regimento de Infantaria N.º 1) (Training unit), in Beja
  - Infantry Regiment No. 10 (Regimento de Infantaria N.º 10), in São Jacinto Airfield
    - 2nd Paratroopers Infantry Battalion (2.º Batalhão de Infantaria Paraquedista)
  - Infantry Regiment No. 15 (Regimento de Infantaria N.º 15), in Tomar
    - 1st Paratroopers Infantry Battalion (1.º Batalhão de Infantaria Paraquedista)
  - Paratroopers Regiment (Regimento de Paraquedistas), in Tancos
    - Airborne Operations Battalion (Batalhão Operacional Aeroterrestre)
      - Airborne Pathfinders Company (Companhia de Precursores Aeroterrestres)
      - Air Equipment Company (Companhia de Equipamento Aéreo) (Parachute Maintenance)
      - Air Supply Company (Companhia de Abastecimento Aéreo)
      - Service Company (Companhia de Serviços)
        - Military Working Dogs Platoon (Pelotão Cinotécnico)
  - Commando Regiment (Regimento de Comandos), in Belas
    - Commando Battalion (Batalhão de Comandos)
      - 1st Commando Company (1.ª Companhia de Comandos)
      - 2nd Commando Company (2.ª Companhia de Comandos)
      - 3rd Commando Company (3.ª Companhia de Comandos)
  - Special Operations Troops Center (Centro de Tropas de Operações Especiais), in Lamego
    - Special Operations Force (Força de Operações Especiais)
      - Command and Support Company (Companhia de Comando e Apoio)
        - Sniper Platoon (Pelotão Sniper)
        - Signal Platoon (Pelotão de Transmissões)
        - Medical Platoon (Pelotão Sanitário)
        - Support Platoon (Pelotão de Apoio)
        - Joint Terminal Attack Controller Section (Secção JTAC)
        - Technical Exploitation Operations Section (Secção TEO)
        - Mini-Unmanned Aerial Vehicle Section (Secção de mini-UAV)
      - 6× Special operations task units
  - Artillery Regiment No. 4 (Regimento de Artilharia N.º 4), in Leiria
    - Towed 10,5 Field Artillery Group (Grupo de Artilharia de Campanha 10,5 Rebocado), with L119 105mm towed howitzers
  - Rapid Reaction Brigade Support Unit (Unidade de Apoio da Brigada de Reação Rápida), in Tancos

=== Paratroopers ===
The Paratroopers and elite infantry force and are the heaviest troops on the brigade acting as airborne light infantry, used for conventional conflicts, with emphasis on airborne assaults. Paratrooper battalions contain units with heavy weapons and light vehicles for quick assaults and raids. Paratroopers are instructed at the Parachute Troops School, in Tancos, central Portugal.

- Paratrooper units: (the units are battalion sized, but retain the name regiment for historic reasons)
  - 10th Infantry Regiment (Regimento de Infantaria Nº10)
  - 15th Infantry Regiment (Regimento de Infantaria Nº15)

=== Special Operations Forces ===
The Special Operations Forces are generally the first to arrive and the last to leave the operational area. They are the most autonomous unit of the brigade, able to infiltrate deep behind enemy lines. Not as heavily armed as the Commandos nor the Paratroopers, its units rely on stealth to complete their objectives. Since it is airborne-qualified it can be deployed by air, sea or land.

Special Operators are instructed at the Special Operations Troops Centre in Lamego, northern Portugal.

- Special Operations / CTOE – Special Operations Troops Center (Centro Tropas Operações Especiais)

=== Comandos ===
The Comandos are an elite light infantry unit capable of conducting several special operations missions, although they are mainly a rapid reaction force. They can be deployed by air, sea or land.

Commandos are instructed at the Commando Regiment, in Belas.

- Commando Regiment

== Equipment ==
Armored Vehicles
Name	Origin	Number	Image	Notes
URO VAMTAC ST5	Spain	139		Purchased 139 ST5 variant vehicles in October 2018.: 107 troop carriers; 12 special operations vehicles; 13 ambulances; 7 command post vehicles
HMMWV M1151A1/1152A1	United States	41		Army designation: Auto Blindado Reconhecimento 1,25 ton.: 24 M1025A2 4x4 m/2000 are in service since 2000, 22 were blinded by Plasan Sasa with APK kit.; 17 M1151A1/A2 D 4x4 m/2009.
Panhard M11	France	38		The Portuguese Army currently fields 38 Arquus Ultrav M11D/VBL 4x4 protected scout vehicles. The fleet includes: 12 units with MILAN F2 ATGM and M1919A4 machine guns; 19 units with PL127/40 turret with an M2HB Browning; Unknown units with AN/PPS-5B and M1919A4 machine guns; Unknown units only with M1919A4 machine guns
Anti-aircraft artillery
FIM-92 Stinger	United States	40		40 units operated by Anti-aircraft Artillery Regiment No. 1, Portuguese Paratroopers and Anti-Aircraft Artillery Battery since 1994. In 2021 Portuguese Army acquired new missiles and sights.
Field artillery
L118 light gun	United Kingdom	21		21 in service. The Portuguese Army is considering to add a few improvements to its BAE Systems M119 Light Gun 105mm lightweight towed howitzers. They are essentially fielded by the Rapid Reaction Brigade.
Unmanned aerial vehicles (UAVs)
AeroVironment RQ-11 Raven	United States	36		Twelve systems or 36 aircraft (together with associated services and equipment) were purchased through the NSPA on 20 August 2018.
Parrot ANAFI	France	2		Used by Special Operations Troops Centre.
DJI Mavic	China	+20		Seen in use by Portuguese Paratroopers, number of units purchased unknown.

== International assignments ==
=== Independent Airborne Brigade missions ===
As the ancestor of the Rapid Reaction Brigade, the Independent Airborne Brigade made several missions to several countries mainly in peacekeeping operations. Paratrooper Battalions were sent to Bosnia, East-Timor and Kosovo.

=== Afghanistan ===
After the creation of the brigade, the unit was sent to Afghanistan. An entire Commando company was sent to the area (western provinces), suffering the first KIA of the Portuguese Armed Forces since the end of the Portuguese Colonial War, during a daytime patrol. The KIA Comando was 1st Sergeant Roma Pereira, mortally hit when an IED detonated his Humvee.

The Comandos were replaced by a company of Paratroopers who suffered no casualties while performing the mission. This company was yet again replaced by a second company of Comandos.

=== Bosnia ===
In the beginning of 2007, the Portuguese Defense Minister decided to end the mission in Bosnia due to the lack of need of a military presence in the area. All units from the Rapid Reaction Brigade and from the Portuguese Mechanized Brigade present in the region withdrew.
