= Almourol =

Islet in the Tagus river

Coordinates: 39.462°N 8.385°W

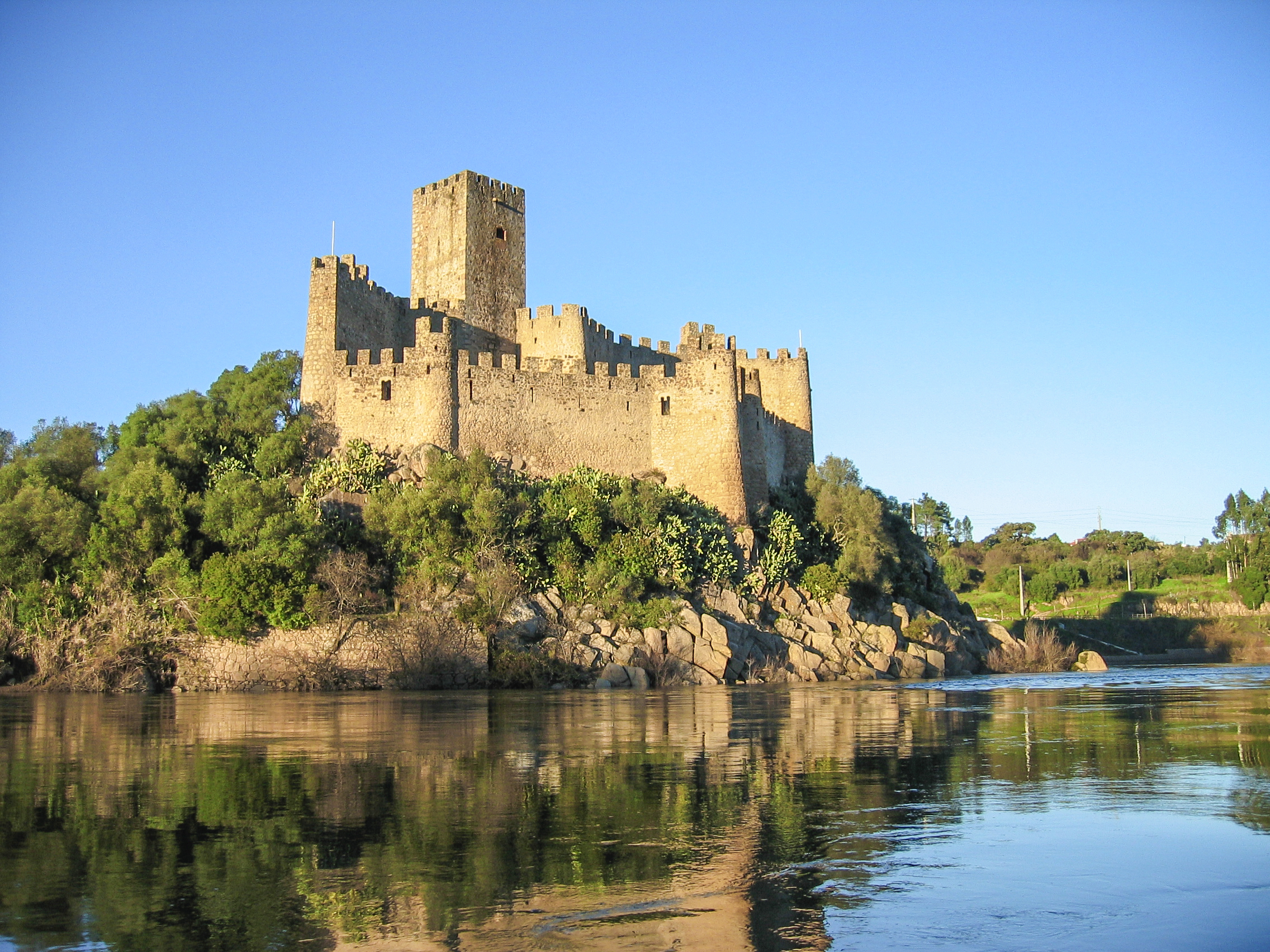
The Almourol Island Castle, Portugal

Almourol is an islet in the Tagus river, in the Portuguese civil parish of Praia do Ribatejo, Oeste e Vale do Tejo region. The small island lies in the middle of the Tagus, a few kilometres below its confluence with the Zêzere River.

The castle of Almourol, a Portuguese National Monument, dominates the islet. It stands near the town of Tancos.
