= Pathfinders Company (Portugal) =

Air-Land Pathfinders Company
- Portuguese: Companhia de Precursores Aeroterrestres
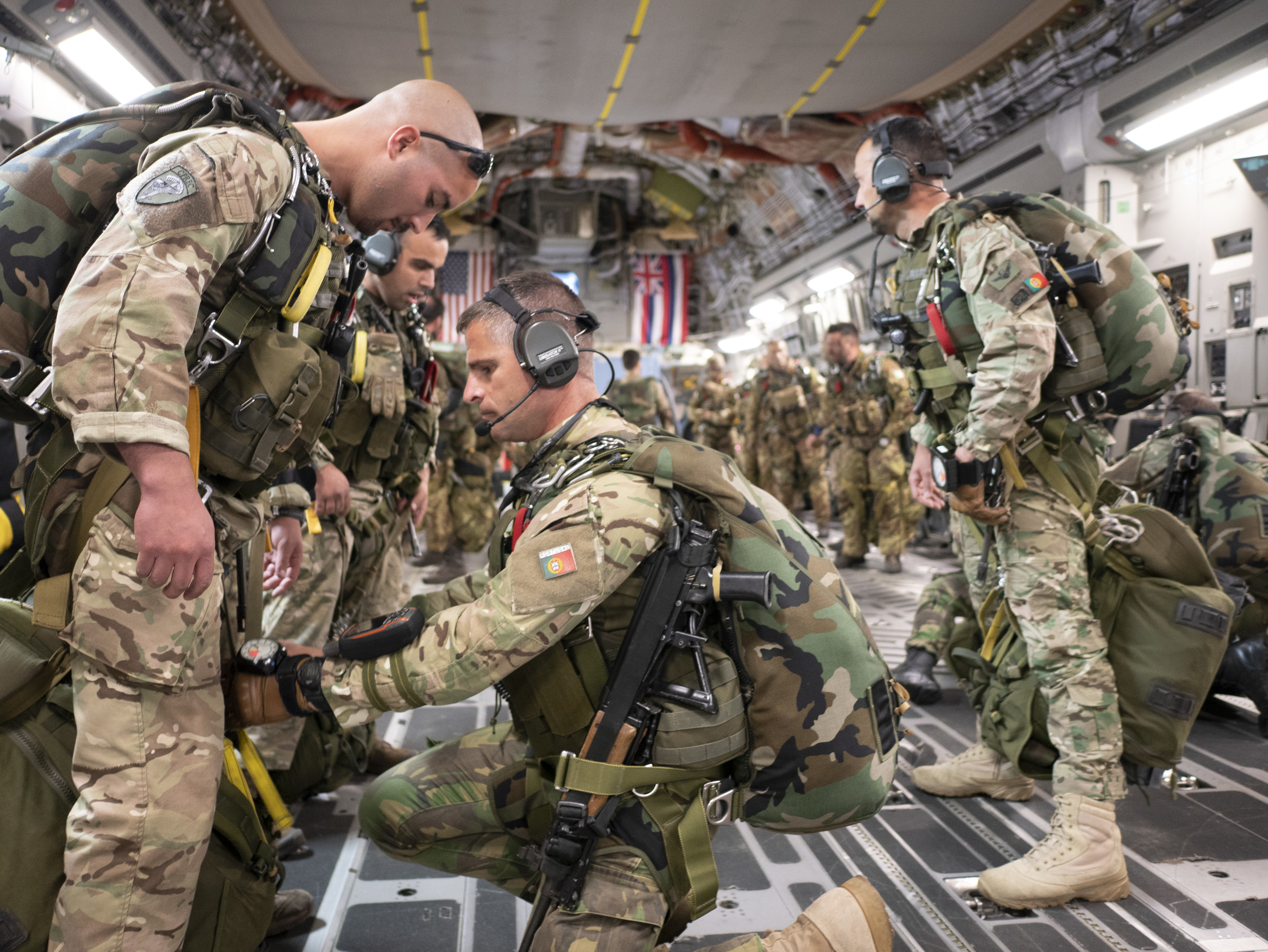
- Portuguese Pathfinder's with Italian Paratroopers.
- Active: Unknown – Present day
- Country: Portugal
- Allegiance: Portugal
- Branch: Portuguese Army
- Type: Pathfinder
- Size: 60 elements (1 company)
- Part of: Aeroterrestrial Support Battalion
- Nickname: Precs
- Mottos: Deixa arder em ti a chama de ser Prec; Let burn in you the flame of being Prec

The Air-Land Pathfinders Company (Portuguese: Companhia de Precursores Aeroterrestres) - known as the Precs - is a forward observer, long-range penetration, and special reconnaissance unit of the Portuguese Paratroopers. This unit is part of the Airborne Support Battalion which is based in Tancos. Its specialty is high altitude mission insertions through the use of HAHO and HALO jumps and reconnaissance of landing zones for other paratroopers to be dropped.

It is also an operational unit for the Portuguese Rapid Reaction Brigade (BRR), one of the three brigades that make up the Portuguese Army.

== The Unit ==
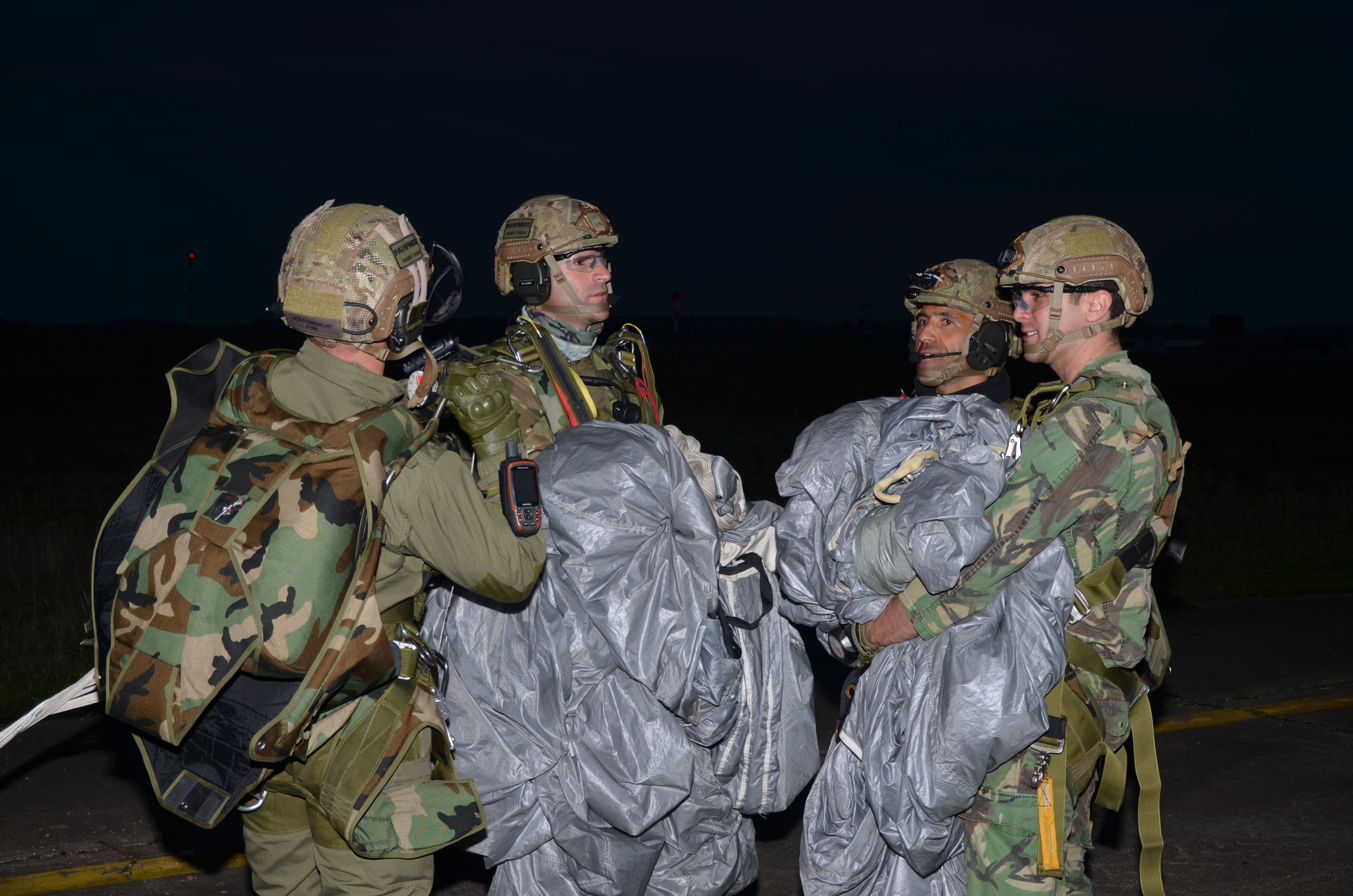
Portuguese High Altitude Paratroopers conducted high altitude training jumps from a USA V22-Osprey during Trident Juncture 15.

The Pathfinders Company is attached to the Airborne Support Battalion, of the ETP. It is a key element for aerial infiltration, through operational free fall (using HALO and HAHO jumps), although the unit can be inserted by sea or ground transport.

This unit was practically unknown by the Portuguese society in general and even on the Portuguese Armed Forces until very recently and is considered to be the elite of the Portuguese paratroopers. The Precs have participated in a variety of national and international exercises.

== Organization ==
The Pathfinders Company is commanded by a major and includes:

1. Headquarters;
2. Pathfinder Detachment Alpha - includes 16 elements (1 captain, 5 sergeants, and 10 other ranks), being qualified to do HALO and HAHO jumps;
3. Pathfinder Detachment Bravo - includes 16 elements (1 lieutenant or 2nd lieutenant, 5 sergeants, and 10 other ranks).

== The Mission ==
- Recon of Landings Zones for both fixed-wing and rotor aircraft and airborne drop positions, while establishing the needed assistance to air traffic control navigation and communications, in hostile conditions.
- Limited direct action.
- Recon on any information required by airborne Command.

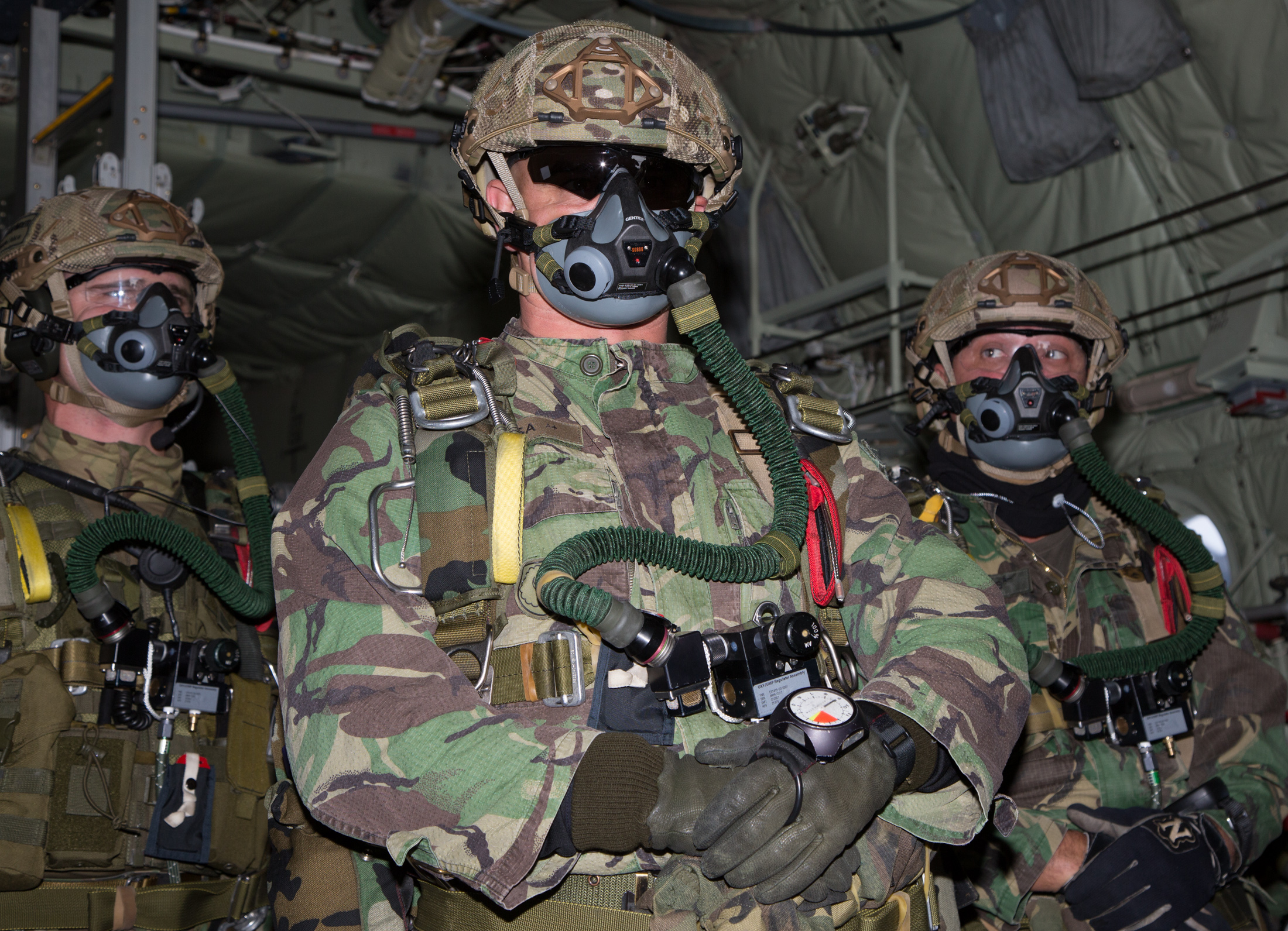
Portuguese parachuter jumping out of a Canadian C-130 at about 9900 feet about ground level

== Selection & Training ==
Only military personnel who are already qualified as paratroopers and who qualify in addition to the Operations/Operations Auxiliary course can be admitted to this company. This qualification is obtained after successfully attending the respective training given in the Parachute Regiment.

After a series of medical aptitude tests, admission tests take place. There are two days of tests in which the aim is to prove the physical and psychological endurance, the spirit of body and sacrifice necessary for the performance of the future precursor.

1st day; in the morning, a 90-meter run with a 50 kg bag; 1500 meter race with all combat gear; 8000 meter race with all combat gear;

1st day in the afternoon, a 7-meter rope climb with all war material; Swimming Evidence;

2nd day; in the morning, a 30 km march with combat gear.

Whoever overcomes these tests starts the precursor/precursor assistant course the next day.

Phase A

The subjects taught are: Weapons, shooting, transmissions, topography, sappers, reconnaissance, patrols, close combat, first aid, technique of overcoming obstacles, nautical sports, survival, combat in urbanized areas, escape and evasion, military physical education.

The course lasts for 10 weeks, after which the trainee will be able to:

Get the maximum performance from the armament; Get the most out of your transmission equipment; Guide yourself as a member of a prec team using topographic maps, GPS, etc.; Apply sapper techniques; Identify material and equipment in use in military operations; Act as commander of a prec team in the execution of Patrols; Close Anticar Fight (ACar), as commander of a Prec team; Basic first aid as commander of a prec team; Obstacle crossing as commander of a Prec team; Act as commander of a Prec team in amphibious surface operations; Survive for short periods (less than 10 days) without support, in a hostile environment; Act as commander of a prec team in combat in built-up areas; Acting alone and as a team commander in supported and unsupported exfiltration. Phase B

The subjects taught are: Aerial photography, meteorology, air traffic, precursor material, organization and use of precursors, launches and final exercise.

== See also ==
- Pathfinder (military)
