= Portuguese Paratroop Nurses =

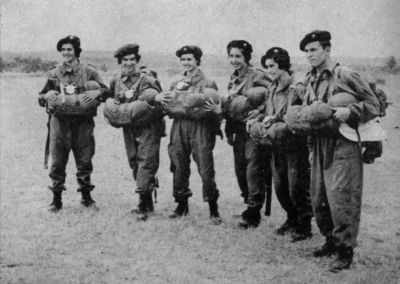
Portuguese Paratroop Nurses

The Portuguese Paratroop Nurses (Portuguese: Enfermeiras Pára-quedistas) were a group of 46 women that, between 1961 and 1974 (the duration of the Portuguese Colonial War), became the first women to be integrated into the Portuguese Armed Forces.

== Origins ==
In 1955, Isabel Rilvas, a Portuguese aviator, went to France to take a parachuting course at Biscarrosse. During her course, she made contact with paratroop nurses of the French Red Cross, who encouraged her to take the idea to Portugal. In 1956, she obtained the 1st degree brevet of civil parachuting at the Biscarrosse Parachuting Centre. In 1957, she obtained the second degree brevet in the same school. In January of the same year, she performed her first jump in Tancos.

Lieutenant-Colonel Kaúlza de Arriaga, then sub-State Secretary of Aeronautics, supported Rivas' idea and started to explore the possibilities of its integration in the Armed Forces.

== Pioneers ==
By order of Kaúlza de Arriaga, the First Parachuting Course for Nurses began in 1961, in the Tancos Military Airfield, where the Rapid Reaction Brigade was quartered. Invitations were made to nurses that were suitable for being the first paratroop nurses. The 11 selected candidates were subject to physical and technical instruction, as well as military instruction, in everything identical to men's training, in order to integrate them in the respective hierarchy. The course started on 6 June 1961, and ended on 8 August of the same year. From the 11 candidates, only six finished the course. Since all of them were called "Maria", the first course finalists were known as As Seis Marias ("The Six Marys"). After completing the course, they received the Green Beret, the brevet of military parachuting and the rank of lieutenant.

== Role in the Army ==
The formation of new paratroop nurses in the Portuguese Armed Forces continued throughout the war. After their formation, they were sent to the theatres of war in Africa: Mozambique, Angola, and Portuguese Guinea. In 1961, some of them stayed in Goa after the Indian invasion.

Since they were nurses, it was very frequent to accompany military operations, as it was part of their job to assist the sick and the wounded in the battlefield. In many cases, they made evacuations under fire, and successfully did hundreds. They also treated civilians (women, children and the elderly) and prisoners of war.

Usually, the evacuation of soldiers by the paratroop nurses had effects on them. There are several reports of dying soldiers that saw in them (the nurses) a maternal image, calling them Mãe (the Portuguese word for mother). The soldiers in the terrain often called them anjos (angels in Portuguese), due to the fact that they were women and saved wounded soldiers from the horrors of the battlefield.

== Disbandment ==
During the Colonial War, they were more active in Guinea, where heavy fighting took place.

In 15 years, nine training courses were completed, from which a total of 46 paratroop nurses were commissioned. With the Carnation Revolution, the services of the paratroop nurses were no longer required, and the unit was therefore disbanded.

== Documentary ==
During the 1960s and '70s, the Portuguese Army, Rádio e Televisão de Portugal (RTP), as well as foreign television stations gathered considerable audiovisual information. In August 2007, the American television History Channel showed a documentary dedicated to these women, entitled Entre o Céu e o Inferno – As Enfermeiras Pára-quedistas (Between Heaven and Hell – The Portuguese Paratroop Nurses).

== See also ==
- Portuguese Colonial War
