= Aeroterrestrial Support Battalion =

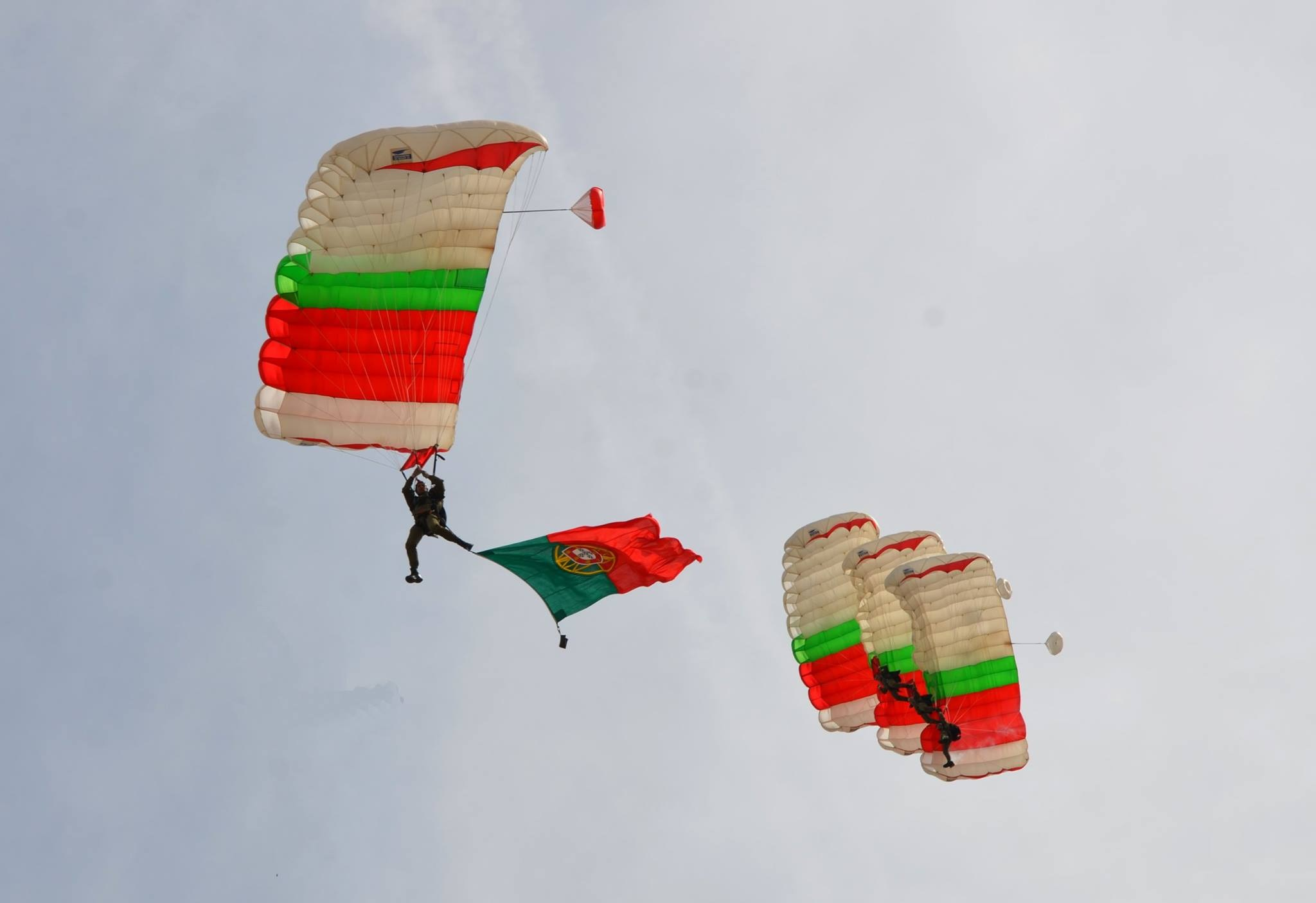
- Aeroterrestrial Support Battalion during a demonstration in 2016
- Country: Portugal
- Branch: Portuguese Army
- Type: Paratrooper
- Size: Battalion
- Garrison/HQ: Tancos Military Base

The Batalhão de Apoio Aeroterrestre (Aeroterrestrial Support Battalion), based at the ETP - Escola de Tropas Páraquedistas (Parachute Troops School), in Tancos is unit responsible for the execution of several key missions of the Portuguese Parachute Troops, such as the operation of launch zones (CPRECs), folding and maintenance of parachutes (CEA) and launching of air supply (CAA).

== Organization ==
The missions of the Airborne Operational Battalion are delegated to the various companies that comprise it:

- Airborne Precursors Company (CPRECs) — A Pathfinder unit;
- Air Equipment Company (CEA) - Folding and maintenance of equipment necessary to carry out airborne operations;
- Air Supply Company (CAA) - Preparation and launch of air supply cargoes;
- Service Company (CS-BOAT) - Battalion administrative services;
- War dogs (integrated in CS-BOAT) - Training and employment of missions that require cinetechnic techniques.
