= São Jacinto =

Coordinates: 15.406°N 73.863°E

São Jacinto is an inhabited island in the estuary of the Zuari River in the Indian state of Goa. The island is closest to the southern banks of the estuary and is connected to the mainland by a causeway. The island houses a defunct lighthouse built during Portuguese rule of Goa.

A church dedicated to St. Hyacinth of Poland (São Jacinto) and a chapel dedicated to St. Dominic (São Domingo) overlook the waters of the river towards the east. Since the village is a residential area, tourists are not allowed to visit. The natives also do not sell or rent out any of the properties to those from outside the village.
