= Tancos =

- Civil parish
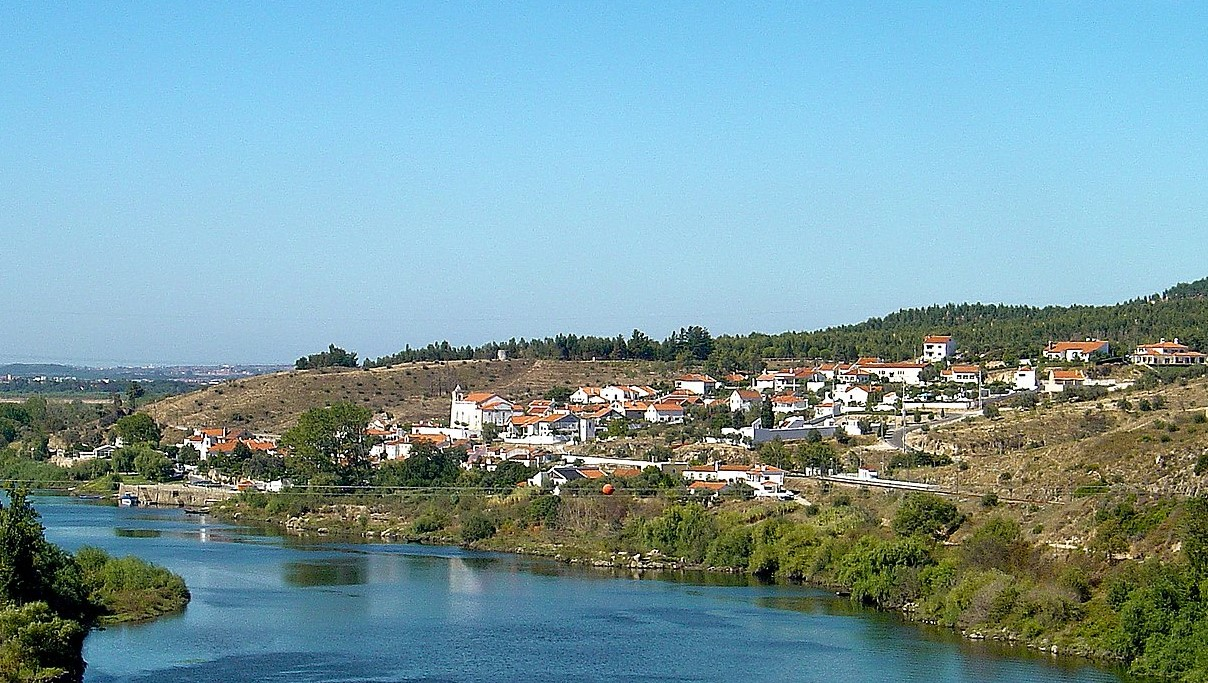
- Tancos and the Tagus

- Location in Portugal
- Coordinates: 39.461°N 8.399°W
- Country: Portugal
- Region: Oeste e Vale do Tejo
- Intermunic. comm.: Médio Tejo
- District: Santarém
- Municipality: Vila Nova da Barquinha

Area
  - Total: 2.04 km^{2} (0.79 sq mi)

Population (2011)
  - Total: 243
  - Density: 119/km^{2} (309/sq mi)
- Time zone: UTC+00:00 (WET)
  - Summer (DST): UTC+01:00 (WEST)
- Patron: Our Lady of Conception

Tancos is a Portuguese freguesia ("civil parish"), located in the municipality of Vila Nova da Barquinha. The population in 2011 was 243, in an area of 2.04 km^{2}.

It had high media exposure in 2017 due to the Tancos arms theft scandal.

Tancos parish is the location of an important military area (Polígono de Tancos) that includes the Tancos Military Air Field, the Parachute Troops School and a military engineering unit.

== Climate ==
Climate data for Tancos (Air Base), 1951-1980, altitude: 83 m (272 ft)
Month	Jan	Feb	Mar	Apr	May	Jun	Jul	Aug	Sep	Oct	Nov	Dec	Year
Record high °C (°F)	22.6 (72.7)	24.8 (76.6)	29.4 (84.9)	32.2 (90.0)	34.8 (94.6)	41.5 (106.7)	40.6 (105.1)	44.0 (111.2)	41.4 (106.5)	32.6 (90.7)	25.3 (77.5)	23.2 (73.8)	44.0 (111.2)
Mean daily maximum °C (°F)	14.0 (57.2)	15.2 (59.4)	17.2 (63.0)	19.7 (67.5)	22.9 (73.2)	26.6 (79.9)	30.0 (86.0)	30.2 (86.4)	27.9 (82.2)	22.8 (73.0)	17.2 (63.0)	14.1 (57.4)	21.5 (70.7)
Daily mean °C (°F)	9.1 (48.4)	10.3 (50.5)	11.8 (53.2)	14.0 (57.2)	16.9 (62.4)	20.2 (68.4)	22.8 (73.0)	22.9 (73.2)	21.2 (70.2)	17.1 (62.8)	12.1 (53.8)	9.3 (48.7)	15.6 (60.2)
Mean daily minimum °C (°F)	4.2 (39.6)	5.3 (41.5)	6.3 (43.3)	8.3 (46.9)	11.0 (51.8)	13.7 (56.7)	15.6 (60.1)	15.6 (60.1)	14.3 (57.7)	11.4 (52.5)	6.9 (44.4)	4.5 (40.1)	9.8 (49.6)
Record low °C (°F)	−6.5 (20.3)	−4.1 (24.6)	−3.5 (25.7)	−1.0 (30.2)	2.5 (36.5)	5.6 (42.1)	10.0 (50.0)	8.1 (46.6)	7.3 (45.1)	1.2 (34.2)	−5.5 (22.1)	−4.5 (23.9)	−6.5 (20.3)
Average rainfall mm (inches)	80.8 (3.18)	59.3 (2.33)	41.0 (1.61)	59.3 (2.33)	47.8 (1.88)	19.5 (0.77)	5.4 (0.21)	8.5 (0.33)	29.1 (1.15)	95.1 (3.74)	85.5 (3.37)	84.9 (3.34)	616.2 (24.24)
Average rainy days (≥ 0.1 mm)	14.4	13.7	13.4	9.2	8.1	5.0	1.6	1.8	5.9	10.4	12.9	12.7	109.1
Average relative humidity (%)	82	78	71	65	62	60	55	55	61	70	78	81	68
Average afternoon relative humidity (%)	71	66	58	54	52	49	42	40	46	57	66	70	56
Mean monthly sunshine hours	133.2	142.2	197.4	228.8	281.5	284.6	342.9	337.7	241.6	214.4	165.8	146.5	2,716.6
Percentage possible sunshine	45	48	54	58	64	63	76	80	65	59	55	51	60
Source 1: Instituto de Meteorologia
Source 2: Portuguese Environment Agency (precipitation)
