= Variants of the Stryker =

The Stryker is a family of eight-wheeled armored fighting vehicles derived from the Canadian LAV III. Stryker vehicles are produced by General Dynamics Land Systems-Canada (GDLS-C) for the United States Army in Canada.

The Stryker was conceived as a family of vehicles forming the backbone of a new medium-weight brigade combat team (BCT) that was to strike a balance between armored brigade combat teams (heavy armor) and infantry brigade combat teams. The service launched the Interim Armored Vehicle competition, and in 2000, the service selected the LAV III proposed by GDLS and General Motors Defense. The service named this family of vehicles the "Stryker".

Ten variants of the Stryker were initially conceived, some of which have been upgraded with v-hulls. The Stryker chassis modular design supports a wide range of variants. Excepting the mobile gun system variant, the M1126 infantry carrier vehicle variant served as the basis for the 10 original Stryker variants.

== M1126 infantry carrier vehicle ==
M1126 infantry carrier vehicle
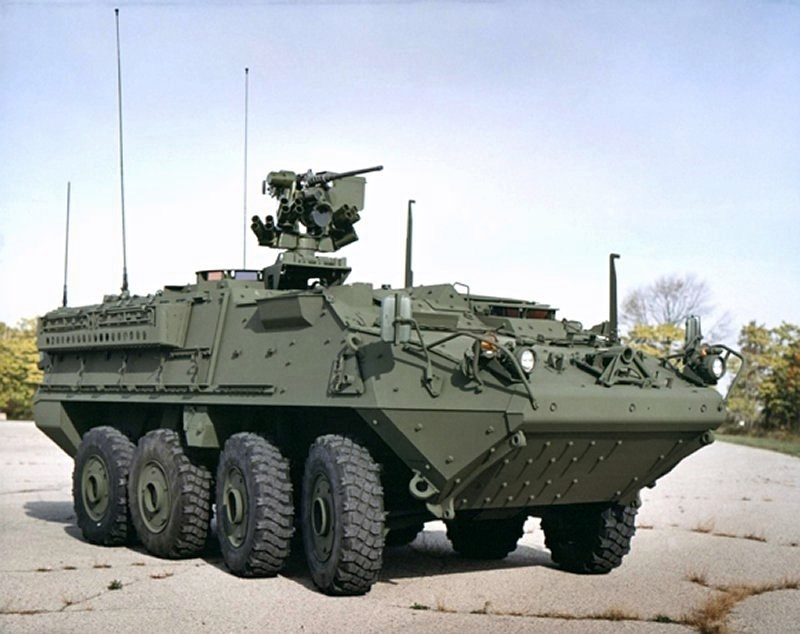
- Stryker ICV, c. 2004
- Type: Armored personnel carrier

Service history
- Used by: United States Army; Ukrainian Ground Forces
- Wars: War in Afghanistan; Iraq War; Russo-Ukrainian War; Russian invasion of Ukraine

Specifications
- Mass: 16.47 tonnes (18.12 short tons; 16.21 long tons)
- Length: 6.95 m (22 ft 10 in)
- Width: 2.72 m (8 ft 11 in)
- Height: 2.64 m (8 ft 8 in)
- Crew: 2+9
- Armor: 14.5 mm resistant
- Main armament: 0.5 inch (12.7 mm) M2 Browning machine gun or 40 mm Mk 19 grenade launcher or four M6 smoke grenade launchers mounted in a Protector remote weapon station (ICV)
- Secondary armament: .50-inch M2 MG
- Engine: diesel 260 kW (350 hp)
- Power/weight: ICV: 15.8 kW/t (19.3 hp/sh tn)
- Suspension: 8×8 wheeled with hydrostrut leaf spring
- Operational range: 180 km (110 mi)
- Maximum speed: 100 km/h (62 mph)

The M1126 infantry carrier vehicle (ICV) is an armored personnel carrier and part of the Stryker family of vehicles (derived from the Canadian LAV III 8x8) used by the United States Army and Royal Thai Army. Models with the double V-hull upgrade are known as the M1256 ICVV.

The infantry carrier vehicle provides protected transport and, during dismounted assault, supporting fire for the infantry squad. The Stryker is a full-time four-wheel drive, selectively eight-wheel drive, armored vehicle weighing approximately 19t which carries an infantry squad with their equipment. On paved roads the vehicle can attain speeds of 62 miles per hour (100 km/h) without a governor and 35 miles per hour (56 km/h) with a governor.

The basic infantry carrier vehicle (ICV) provides armored protection for the two-man crew and a squad of nine soldiers.

The vehicle's commander has a Force XXI Battle Command Brigade and Below (FBCB2) digital communications system that allows communication between vehicles through text messaging and a map network, as well as with the battalion. The map shows the position of all vehicles on the battlefield and the commander can mark the position of enemy forces on the map, which can then be seen by other commanders.

The M1126 ICV has a Protector remote weapon station with a universal soft mount cradle, which can mount either a .50 caliber M2 Browning machine gun, a 40mm MK19 grenade launcher or a 7.62×51mm NATO M240 machine gun. It is also armed with four M6 smoke grenade launchers.

Army officials plan to up-gun Stryker ICVs with a 30 mm cannon in a Kongsberg Protech Systems' Medium Caliber Remote Weapons Station (MCRWS), which does not extend into the crew compartment and take up space and can be loaded from inside. Test firings occurred on a Stryker demonstrator on 19 February 2014, showing increased lethality and accuracy over the standard .50-caliber machine gun at ranges from 600-1,550 meters; the 30 mm cannon is capable of hitting targets over 2,000 meters away.

After comparative testing of the Kongsberg MCRWS mounted to Strykers, the U.S. Army approved in April 2015 the equipping of 81 of the 2nd Cavalry Regiment's Strykers with 30 mm Mk44 Bushmaster II cannons following a lethality upgrade request to increase lethality against other light armor vehicles while preserving its wheeled mobility advantages. The first upgraded ICV, designated XM1296 "Dragoon", was delivered for testing on 27 October 2016, with fielding to begin in May 2018. The first infantry carrier vehicle Dragoon (ICVD) was delivered to the 2CR in Germany on 8 December 2017.

In April 2019, the Army decided to add cannon armament to three additional brigades of Stryker DVH ICVVA1 vehicles.

== M1127 reconnaissance vehicle ==
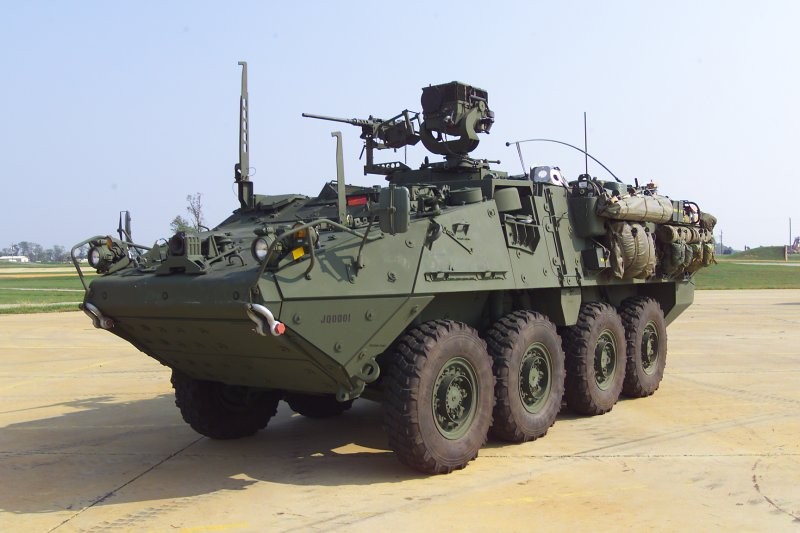
M1127 Stryker RV c. 2006

The M1127 reconnaissance vehicle (RV) is currently in service with the US Army.

The RV provides a platform for RSTA squadrons and battalion scouts to perform reconnaissance and surveillance operations. The RV accommodates seven personnel, including crew.

The platform is a key enabler for both sensor and HUMINT focused surveillance and intelligence operations.

The recce troop is organized into a headquarters section, a mortar section, and three recce platoons. Each of the recce platoons is organized with four Stryker reconnaissance vehicles, mounting either a 12.7 mm M2 .50 cal or a Mk 19 40 mm grenade launcher; the lead truck mounts a long range advanced scout surveillance system alongside its main weapon. Each vehicle carries a squad consisting of a 3-man vehicle crew and a 4-man scout squad for dismounted reconnaissance (6-man squad if augmented with linguist). Each recce squad in the platoon has assigned a human intelligence collector (35M HUMINT). The mortar section consists of four 120-mm self-propelled mortars (Stryker variant) and a fire direction center.

The MAV reconnaissance vehicle is based on the Stryker ICV variant.

Operators

- United States: 545 M1127 Stryker RV as of January 2025.

== M1128 mobile gun system ==
M1128 mobile gun system
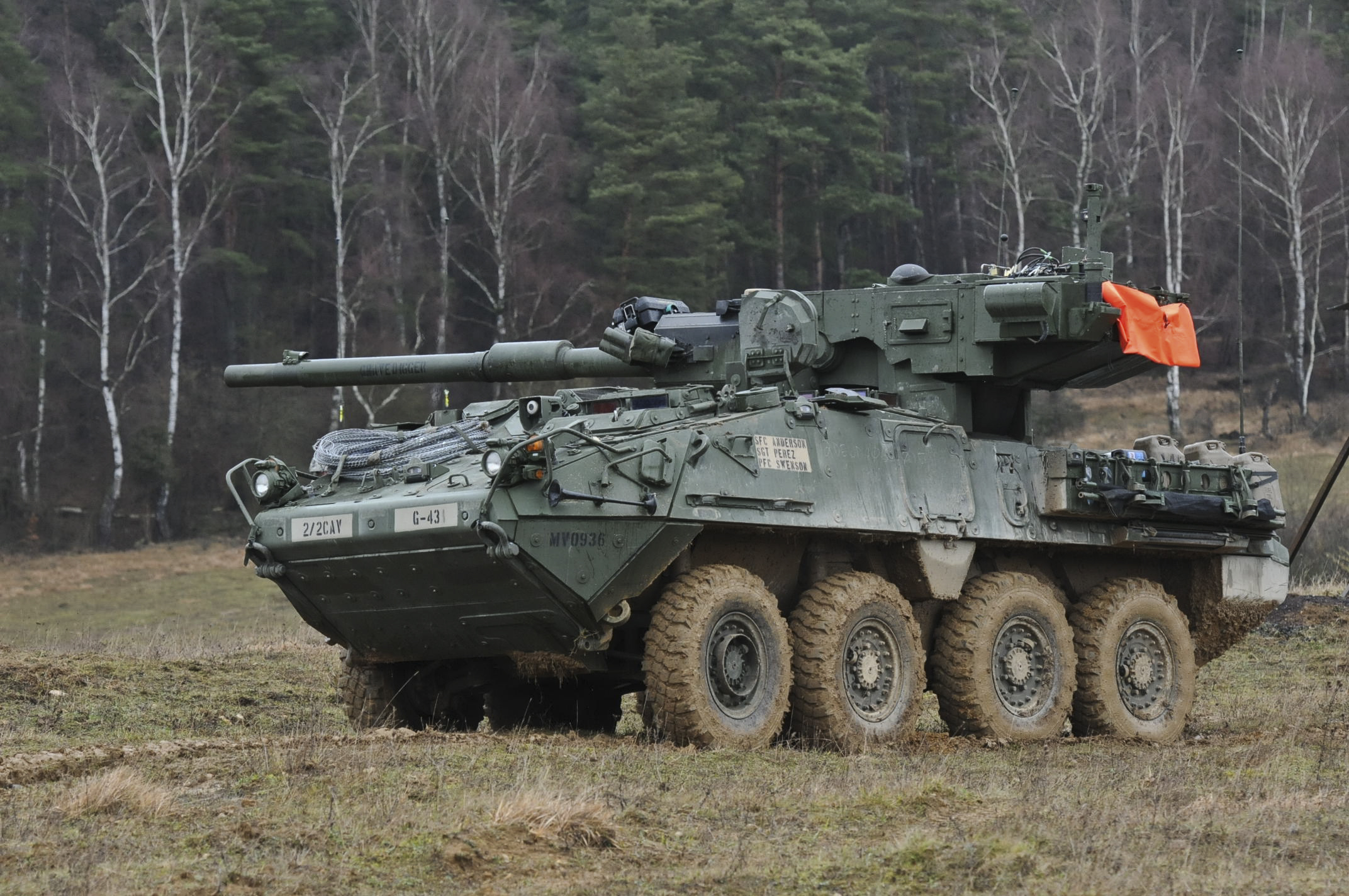
- A M1128 mobile gun system during a training exercise in 2015
- Type: Assault gun
- Place of origin: Canada and the United States

Service history
- Wars: Iraq War; War in Afghanistan

Production history
- Designer: GM Defense of Canada, General Dynamics Land Systems
- Manufacturer: General Dynamics Land Systems
- Unit cost: US$5.26 million (2008)
- Produced: 2002–2010
- No. built: 142

Specifications
- Mass: 18.77 metric tons (20.69 short tons; 18.47 long tons)
- Length: 6.95 m (22.92 ft)
- Width: 2.72 m (8.97 ft)
- Height: >2.64 m (>8.72 ft)
- Crew: 3
- Armor: 14.5x114 mm resistant
- Main armament: M68A2 105 mm cannon
- Secondary armament: 7.62 mm machine gun; M240C coaxial machine gun; 2, M6 smoke grenade launchers
- Engine: Caterpillar C7 turbo diesel 260 kW (350 hp)
- Power/weight: 18.65 hp/ton
- Transmission: Automatic 6 forward, 1 reverse
- Suspension: 8×8 wheeled
- Ground clearance: 38 cm (15 in)
- Fuel capacity: 212 liters (56 US gallons; 47 Imperial gallons)
- Operational range: 528 km (330 mi)
- Maximum speed: 96 km/h (60 mph)

The M1128 mobile gun system (MGS) mounts a 105 mm tank gun.

The MGS was procured in limited numbers by the U.S. Army. It was retired in 2022 due to design and operational deficiencies.

== M1129 mortar carrier ==
The M1129 mortar carrier (MCV) is in use with the United States Army. Models with the double V-hull upgrade are known as the M1252 MCVV.

The M1129 mortar carrier is based on the Stryker infantry carrier vehicle.

The first version of the M1129, the MCV-A, carried a mortar that could only be used dismounted. The M1129B fires its weapon from the mounted position within the vehicle.

The M1129 is used in the US Army Stryker brigade combat teams, where it is part of each Brigade's maneuver infantry battalion's and reconnaissance, surveillance and target acquisition (RSTA) squadron's modified table of organization and equipment (MTOE). The vehicles are either organically subordinated to battalion level or company level. The battalion level vehicles are armed with the RMS6L 120 mm mortar system, which is the vehicle mounted version of the RMS6L 120 mm mortar and Cardom. Additionally, they carry the 81 mm M252 mortar that can only be used in a dismounted capacity. The company level vehicles also carry a vehicle-mounted 120 mm mortar, which is augmented by the 60 mm M224 mortar for dismounted use. The RSTA squadron only receives the 120 mm mounted mortar, there is no augmentation dismounted maneuvers. Each Stryker infantry battalion thus has a total number of 10 mortar carriers, all of which are equipped with the 120 mm system. Each Stryker RSTA battalion has a total of 6 mortar carriers, all of which are also equipped with the 120 mm system.

The first M1129 vehicles were put into service in Spring 2005 with the 172nd Stryker Brigade Combat Team. The 172nd Stryker Brigade deployed to Iraq in August 2005 being the first unit to fire the M1129/MCV-B in theatre.

== M1130 commander's vehicle ==
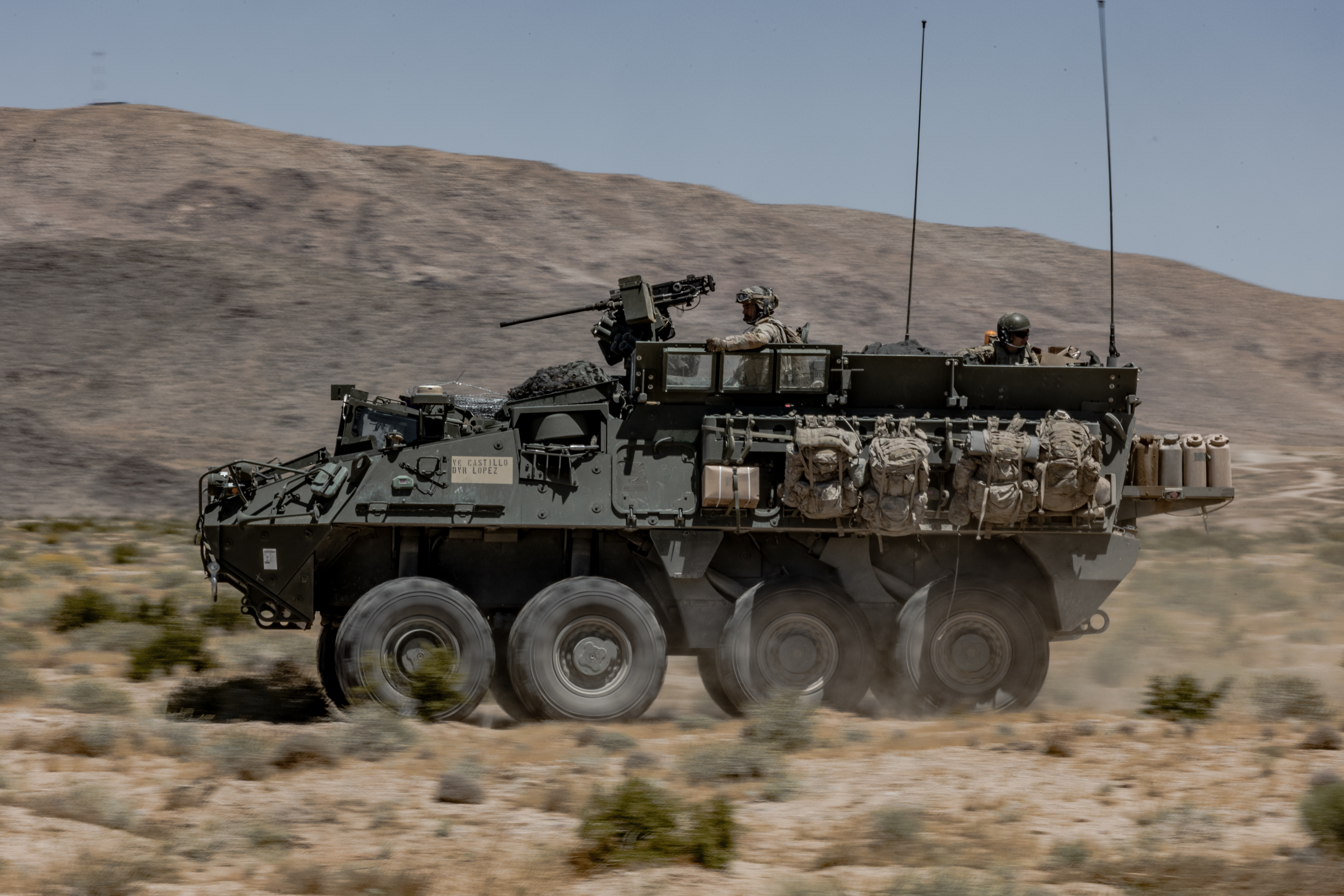

The M1130 commander's vehicle (CV) is an armored command vehicle. It is used within the brigade to provide means to receive information, analyze and transmit data, and control forces carrying out combat missions. Models with the double V-hull upgrade are known as the M1255 CVV.

The CV provides an operational platform for elements of command within the Stryker brigade combat team. The CV integrates the C4ISR equipment for the unit commanders. It has the ability to access aircraft power and antenna systems to plan missions while en route aboard aircraft.

Commanders must have the capability to see and direct the battle continuously, maintaining the common relevant operating picture (CROP) for all friendly forces within their respective areas of operation. This enhanced situational awareness and understanding will enable commanders to synchronize and employ widely dispersed and highly mobile forces at decisive points of the operation. Initial fielding of the CV will be three platforms to the brigade headquarters, two platforms to the infantry maneuver battalion HQ, and two per infantry maneuver company within each battalion.

The CV is based on the Stryker Infantry carrier vehicle (ICV) platform. The CV is an organic vehicle to the ICV maneuver formation.

== M1131 fire support vehicle ==
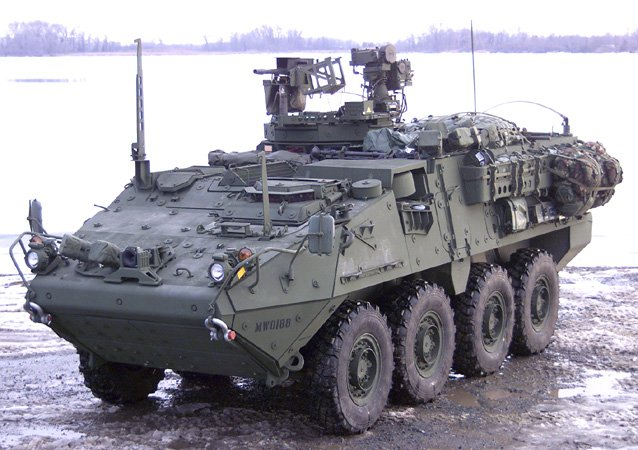
FSV c. 2006

The M1131 fire support vehicle (FSV) provides automated enhanced surveillance, target acquisition, target identification, target tracking, target designation, position location and communications functionality. Targets will be transmitted instantly to the fire support system and shooter. Models with the double V-hull upgrade are known as the M1251 FSVV.

The FSV provides enhanced surveillance, target acquisition, target identification, target designation, and communications supporting the SBCT with ”first round“ fire-for-effect capability. It integrates the current M707 Striker Mission Equipment Package. The FSV provides the Fire Support Teams (FIST) with the capability to automate command and control functions, to perform fire support planning, directing, controlling and cross-functional area coordination, and execution.

The FSV is based on the ICV variant. The FSV is an organic vehicle to the ICV maneuver formation and helps maximize commonality of the platform while simultaneously reducing the maintenance footprint and variety of logistics support.

Four combat radio nets (Co Cmd, Mortar Plt, FECC, Fires 1-4) allow secure voice and digital communications with, Initial Fire Support Automation System (IFSAS) or Advanced Field Artillery Tactical Data System (AFATDS), the maneuver command communications, and other fire support assets. FBCB2 is required for situation awareness and maneuver force communications in distributed operations and on the non-linear battlespace.

A vehicular intercom system (VIS) that enables communication on each of the four combat radio nets from each crew positions is required in the MAV-FSV. The VIS permits each of the operating stations to selectively monitor the intercommunications system and any combination of four radio receivers, while selectively transmitting on any of the radio transmitters in addition to the intercommunications system.

FS MAV must be capable of hosting the hand-held terminal unit and tactical radios for transmission of digital targeting and fire support data. Targeting data must be passed automatically to provide timely, error-free targeting information through digital means, to include spot reports providing updated situational awareness. Digital communications is required to all fire support assets to forward targeting data to the attack platforms without causing the platform operators to transcribe information and to allow for the automated processing of target, clearance, and firing data. The capability to communicate with all joint fire support assets allows the full utilization of the attack capabilities available.

Since the M1131 fire support vehicle is designed for target tracking and identification, the Army is integrating a directed energy weapon onto the version, called the mobile expeditionary high-energy laser (MEHEL), to defend against small and medium unmanned aerial vehicles (UAVs). The laser was tested at 2 kW in April 2016, and a 5 kW version became operational in 2017, with plans to increase power to 18 kW by 2018.

== M1132 engineer squad vehicle ==
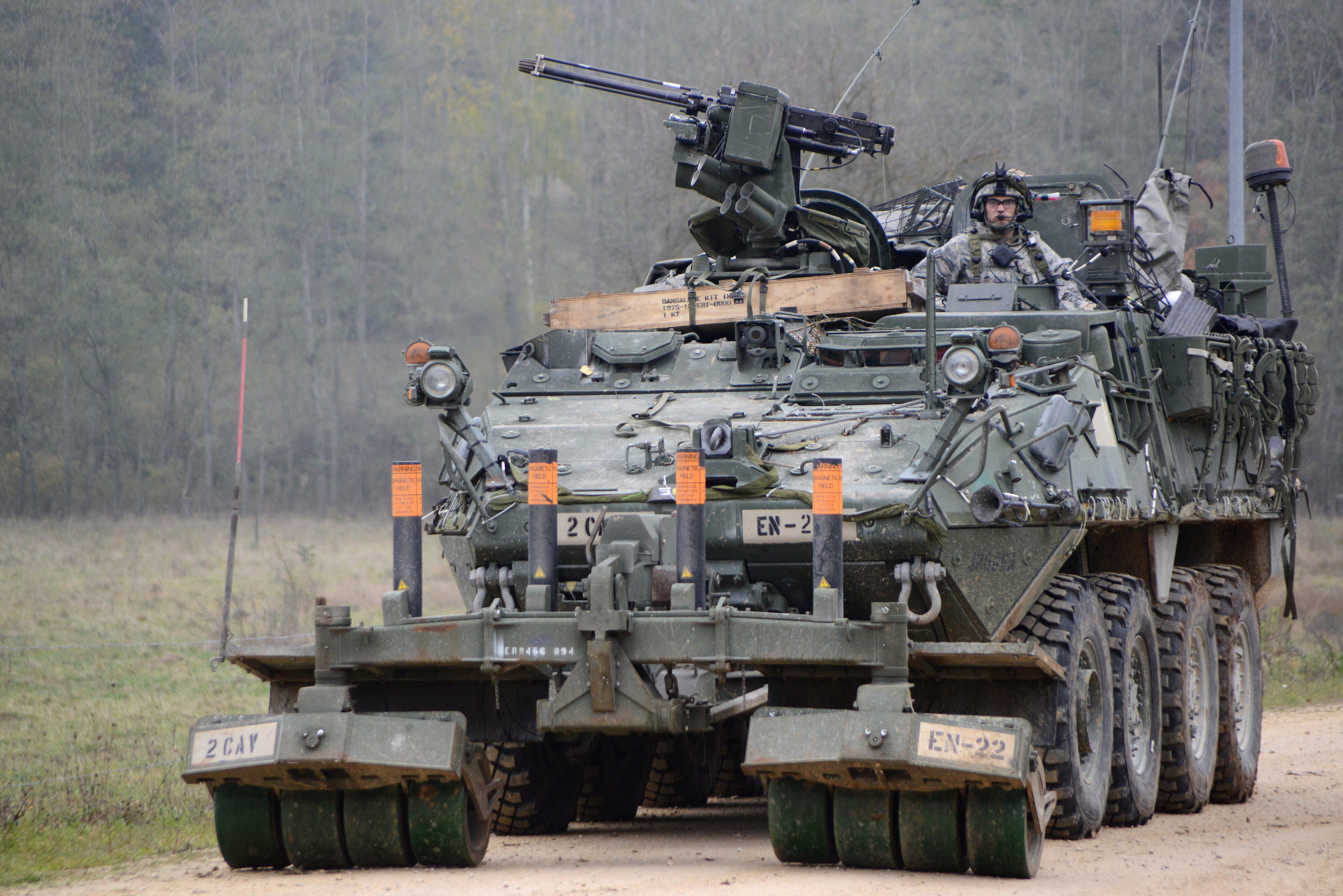
U.S. Army ESV in 2012

The M1132 engineer squad vehicle (ESV) is the combat engineering variant of the Stryker. It is issued to combat engineer squads in the US Army Stryker brigade combat teams. Models with the double V-hull upgrade are known as the M1257 ESVV.

Its purpose is to transport and support combat engineers on the battlefield; the vehicle includes obstacle clearing and lane marking systems as well as mine detection devices.

The engineer vehicle is based on the infantry carrier. Its most distinctive feature is a mine-clearance blade, it is most often towing a wheeled trailer loaded with additional equipment. The vehicle is capable of clearing mines on paved surfaces and some rubble clearance. Other mobility tasks can be completed by the mounted engineer squad with the tools on the vehicle and trailer.

About twenty M1132 engineer squad vehicle were donated to Ukraine along with ninety M1126 Stryker vehicles due to the Russian invasion of Ukraine. They were deployed to the frontline in August 2023 to take part in the 2023 Ukrainian counteroffensive as part of the 82nd Air Assault Brigade. According to Oryx blog, as of 6 January 2024, 5 M1132s were confirmed destroyed by photos and videos out of 20 supplied by the U.S.

== M1133 medical evacuation vehicle ==
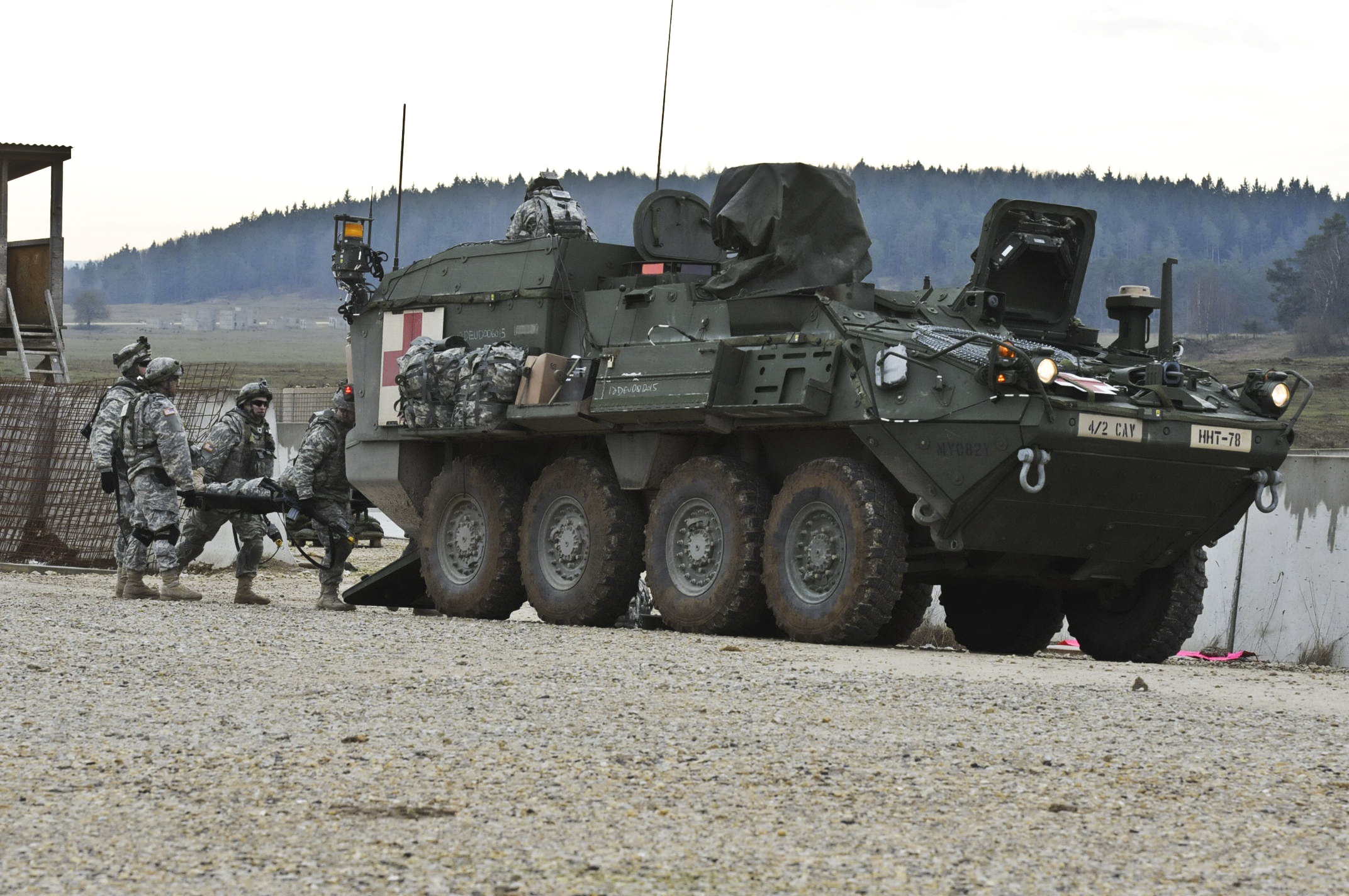
U.S. Army soldier load a simulated casualty onto an MEV in 2015

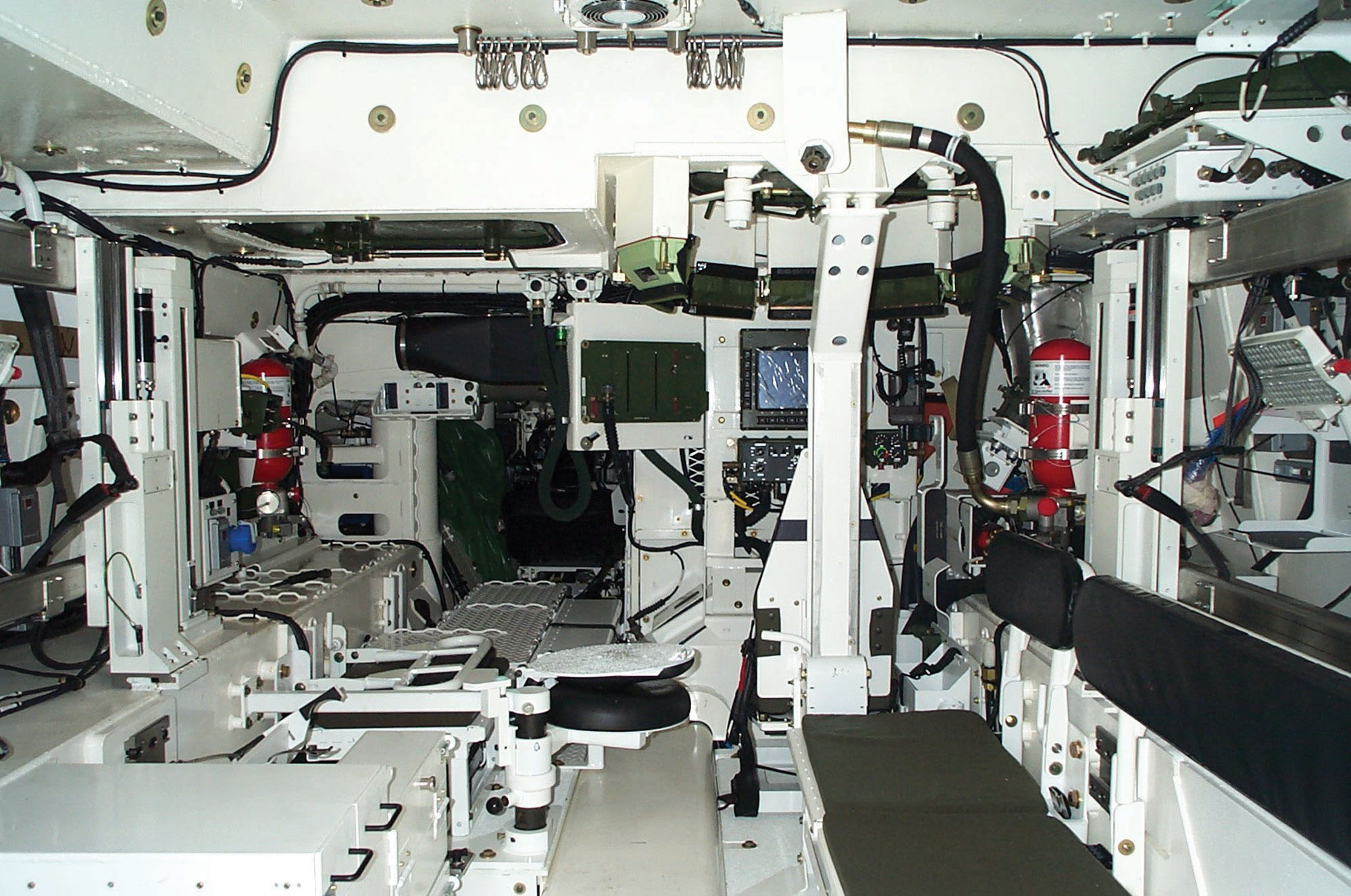
Internal view

The M1133 medical evacuation vehicle is assigned from the Battalion Aid Station for Battalion-sized units, and dedicated to each of the company-sized elements of the unit and provide treatment for serious injury and advanced trauma cases. Models with the double V-hull upgrade are known as the M1254 MEVV.

Integrated medical evacuation support in the SBCT (Stryker Brigade Combat Team), as an integrated part of the internetted combat forward formation, helps the organic medic who accompanies the infantry soldier during dismounted operations. The medical evacuation vehicle and its crew can move forward, covered by integrated overwatching fires which provide protection for the patient and medical team.

This capability keeps the other platforms of the formation free to sustain the integrated support of the assault. The evacuation will include emergency care en route enhanced by the medic and by a protected environment with adequate lighting and accessible medical equipment.

The medical evacuation vehicle is the primary ambulance platform in units equipped with the Stryker family of vehicles. It is based on the infantry carrier variant. The commonality of the platforms reduces the maintenance footprint and variety of logistics support.

The medical evacuation vehicle has an accessible attendant’s seat that allows the attendant to monitor patients.

The ambulance is marked with Geneva Convention insignia that can be removed or masked without altering the camouflage pattern. It has a hydraulically operated rear ramp. This reduces risk of exposure to hostile activity or inclement weather.

== M1134 anti-tank guided missile vehicle ==
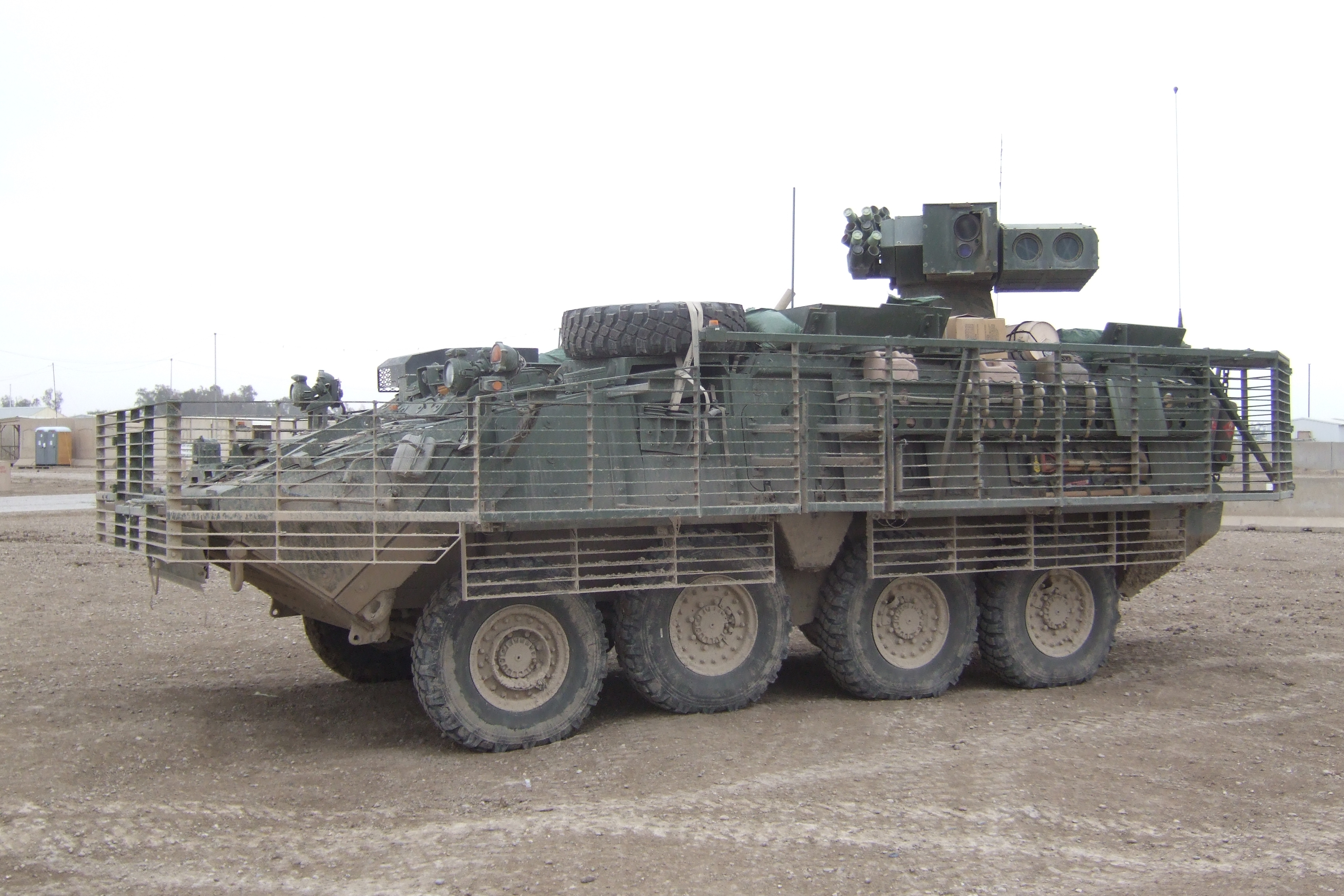
ATGM variant with slat armor in 2007

The M1134 anti-tank guided missile vehicle is an anti-tank missile carrier. As the primary tank destroyer system of the US Army's Stryker Brigade Combat Team (SBCT), the M1134 ATGM Vehicle reinforces the SBCT's infantry battalions, reinforces the SBCT reconnaissance squadron and provides long-range direct fire. Models with the double V-hull upgrade are known as the M1253 ATVV.

The ATGM vehicle provides an anti-armor overwatch capability.It is the primary tank destroyer of the SBCT, capable of defeating many armored threats up to 4 km away using the TOW missile system. The ATGM vehicle provides standoff for the SBCT by use of its SACLOS guided missiles, which are effective at ranges equal to or exceeding those of most cannons, autocannons, or small arms.

The ATGM vehicles are primarily operated by an independent infantry company assigned to each of the Stryker brigades. In the 2nd and 3rd Stryker Cavalry Regiments, O Troop is part of the Regimental RSTA Squadron.

- 51st Infantry Regiment
  - F Company: 1st Brigade, 1st Armored Division
- 52nd Infantry Regiment
  - A Company: 2nd Brigade, 2nd Infantry Division
  - B Company: 2nd Brigade, 25th Infantry Division
  - Hellcat Troop: 1st Brigade, 2nd Infantry Division
  - D Company: 1st Brigade, 25th Infantry Division
  - F Company: 4th Brigade, 2nd Infantry Division
- 2/104th Cavalry Regiment
  - D Troop: 56th Brigade, 28th Infantry Division, Pennsylvania Army National Guard

The M1134 ATGM vehicle is based on the infantry carrier platform due to the close parallels of operational requirements and battlefield capabilities between the two systems.

The ATGM MAV's purpose is to provide the brigade's main tank killing capability firing heavy anti-tank missiles to defeat enemy armored vehicles at range before the enemy tanks can return fire. The intention is that the brigade's separate anti-tank company, equipped with the M1134, will reinforce the brigade's infantry battalions, form part of the brigade reserve, reinforce the brigade reconnaissance squadron in counter-reconnaissance action, and to counterattack the enemy's. This dedicated ATGM vehicle allows the remainder of the brigade's MAV fleet to be optimized for specific capabilities that can function under the anti-tank overwatch umbrella.

Of the 300 Stryker vehicles in a Stryker Brigade Combat Team, nine are M1134 anti-tank vehicles.

As of May 2017, a Stryker Brigade Combat Team is equipped with three platoons of Mobile Gun System Strykers and three platoons of ATGM Strykers in its weapons troop.

== M1135 nuclear, biological, chemical reconnaissance vehicle ==
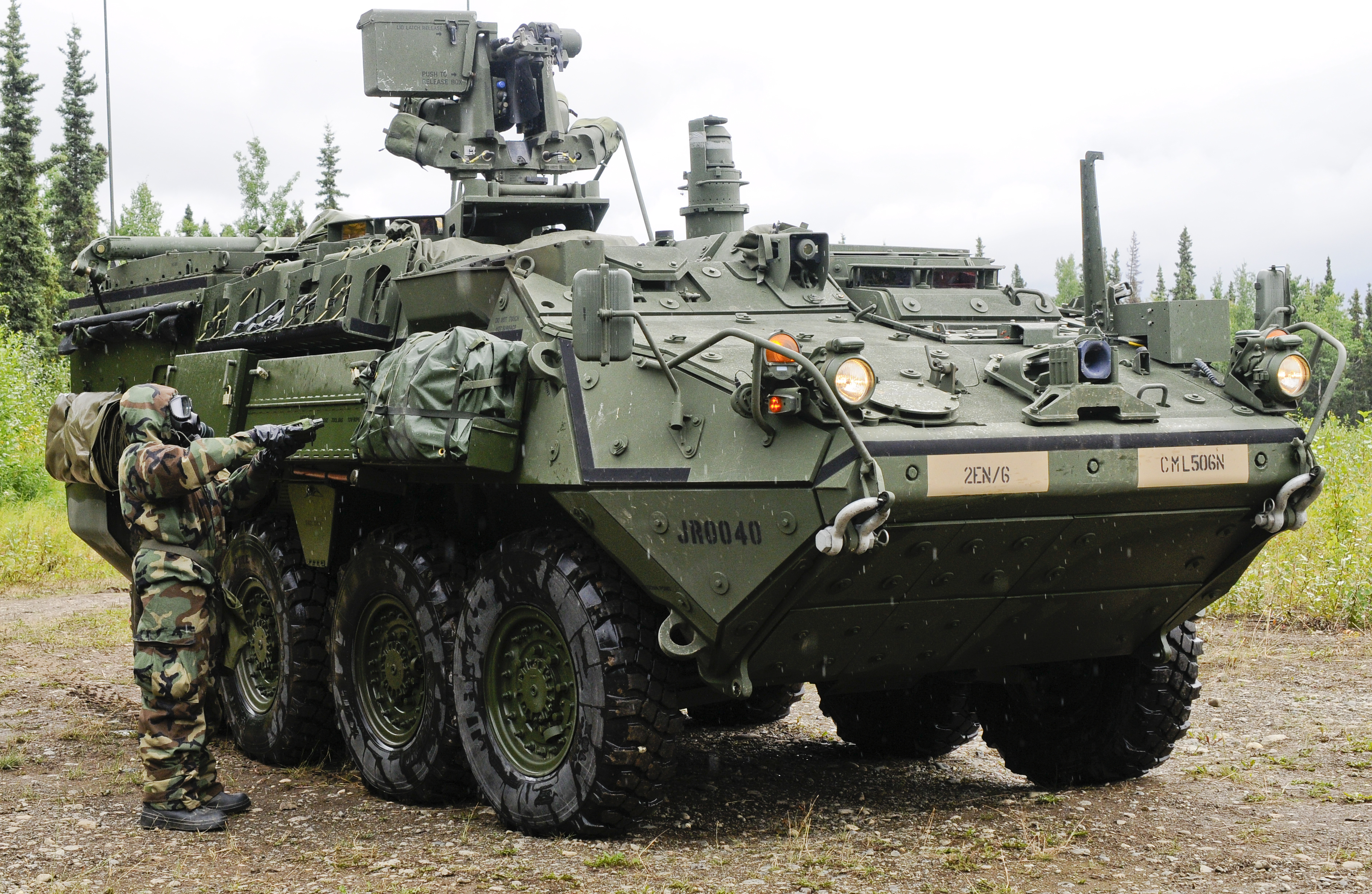
U.S. Army NBCRV in 2012

The M1135 nuclear, biological, chemical reconnaissance vehicle (NBCRV) provides nuclear, biological and chemical detection and surveillance for battlefield hazard visualization.

The NBCRV provides situational awareness to increase the combat power of the Stryker Brigade Combat Team (SBCT). The core of the NBCRV is its on-board integrated NBC sensor suite and integrated meteorological system. An NBC positive overpressure system (where interior air pressure is higher than ambient air pressure outside, rather than vice versa) minimizes cross-contamination of samples and detection instruments, provides crew protection, and allows extended operations at MOPP 0. It replaces the M93 Fox vehicle.

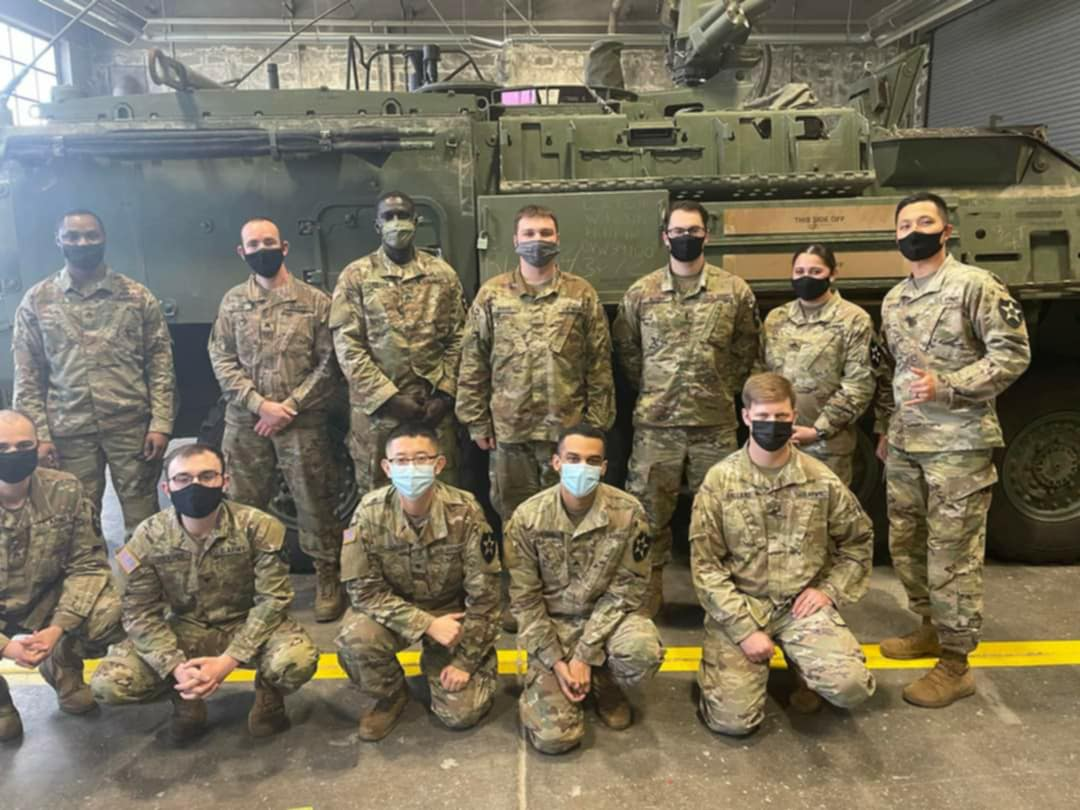
US Army CBRN RECCE Platoon in front of M1135 NBCRV

The NBCRV detects and collects chemical and biological contamination in its local environment on the move through point detection (Chemical Biological Mass Spectrometer (CBMS) and Joint Biological Point Detection System (JBPDS)), and at a distance through the use of a standoff detector (JSLSCAD). It automatically integrates contamination information from detectors with input from on-board navigation and meteorological systems and automatically transmits digital NBC warning messages through the Mission Command System.

As of 2010, the U.S. Army does not plan to field Stryker double V-hull (DVH) versions of the NBCRV in Afghanistan.

Chemical biological mass spectrometer (CBMS), built by Hamilton Sundstrand, is a detection system for chemical warfare agents and biological warfare agents. CBMS was originally developed by a team led by Oak Ridge National Laboratory.

Operators

- Iraq: On 25 July 2013, Iraq requested the sale of 50 M1135 NBCRV reconnaissance vehicles for $900 million.
- United States: In October 2013, the U.S. Army decided to reduce the overall number of M1135 Strykers it will procure from 417 to 307 vehicles.

== M1265A1 Stout M-SHORAD ==
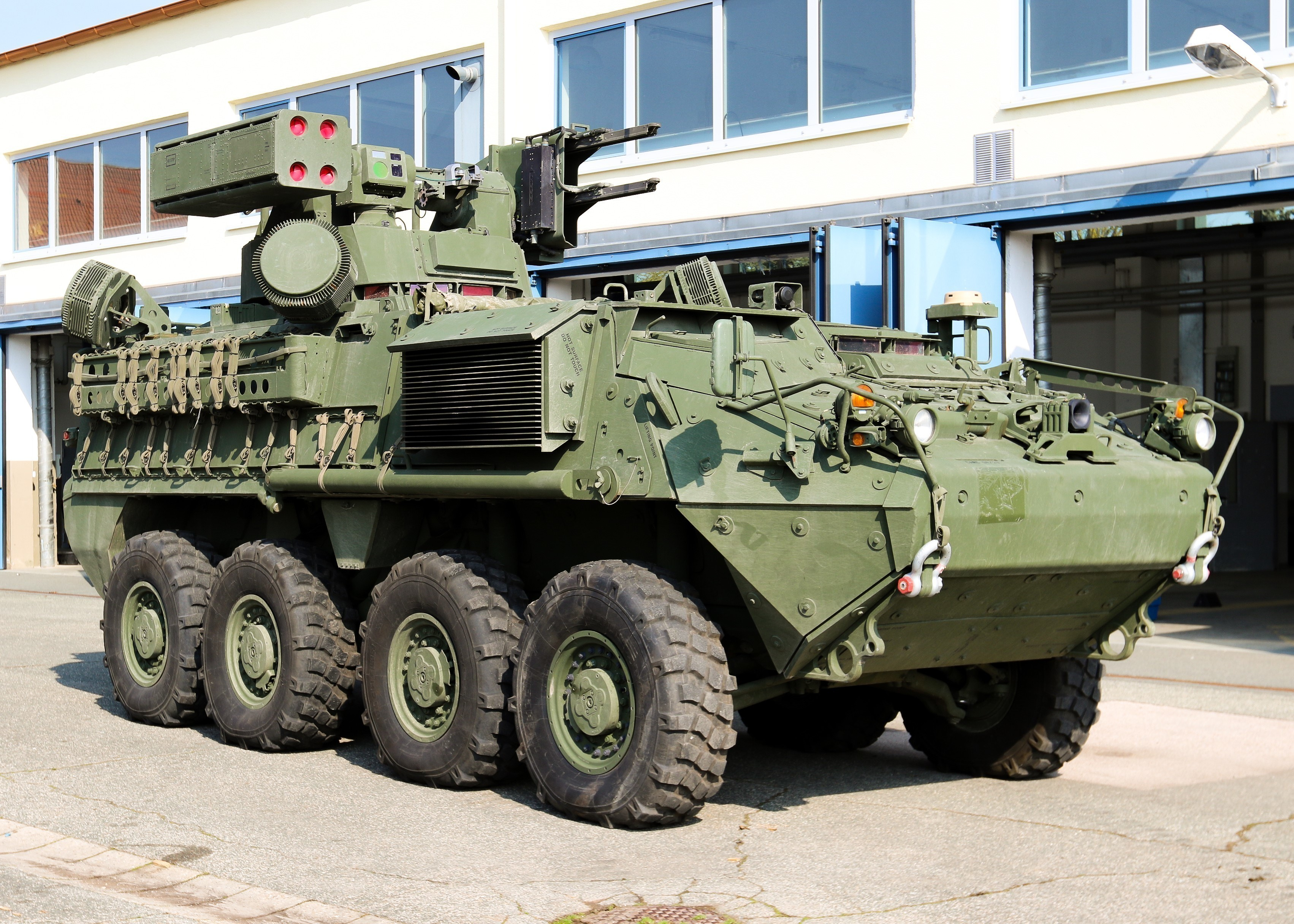
U.S. Army M-SHORAD Stryker in 2023

The M1265A1 Stout M-SHORAD variant integrates a Stinger Vehicle Universal Launcher (SVUL). Each pod that holds four missiles, and the vehicle is also armed with an XM914 30mm cannon and the 7.62 M240 machine gun.

== M1296 Infantry Carrier Vehicle Dragoon ==
M1296 Infantry Carrier Vehicle Dragoon (ICVD)
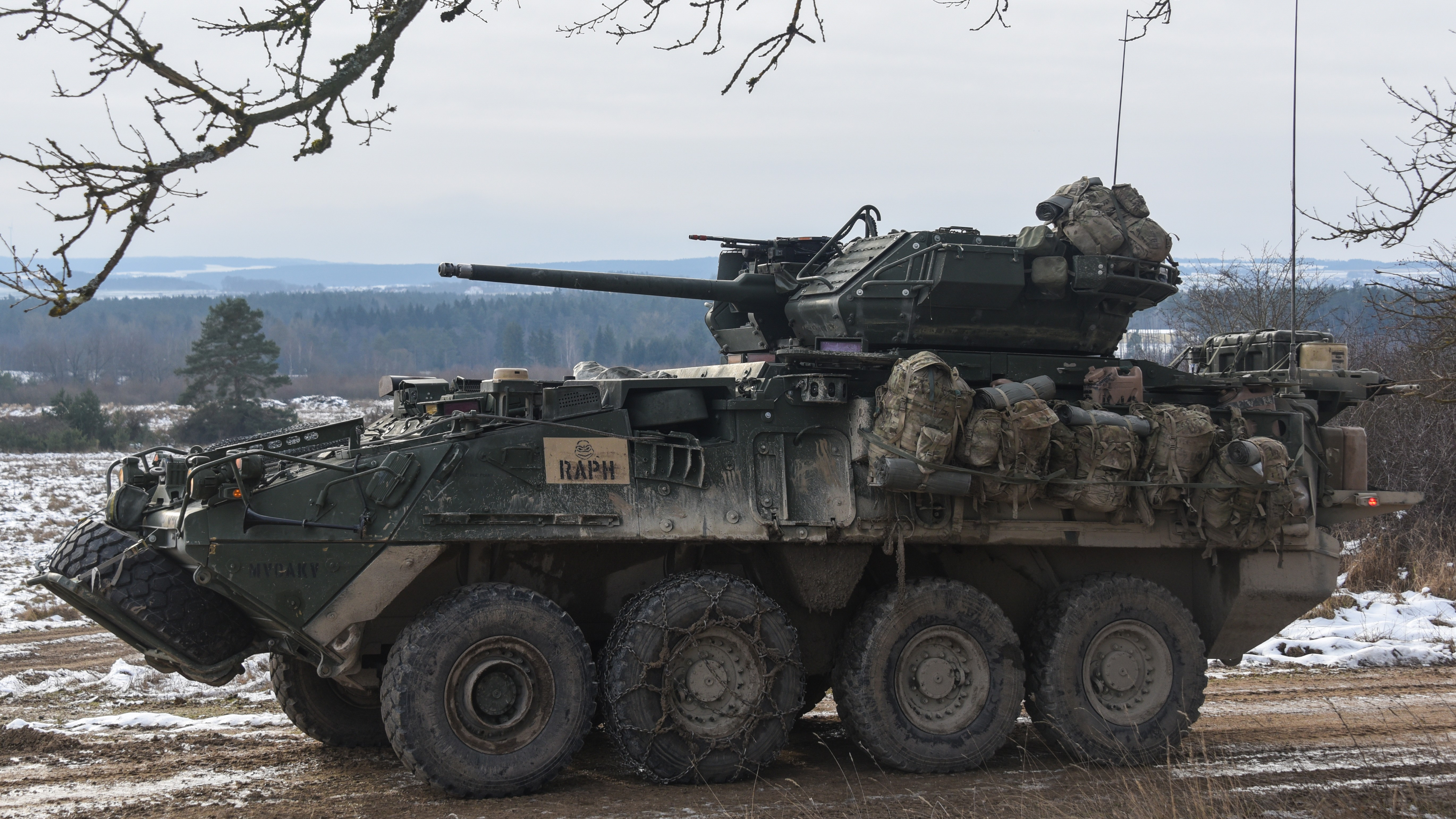
- Type: Infantry fighting vehicle
- Place of origin: United States

Service history
- In service: 2018-present
- Used by: United States (see Operators below for details)

Specifications
- Mass: 19.525 tonnes (21.52 short tons; 19.22 long tons)
- Length: 6.95 m (22 ft 10 in)
- Width: 2.72 m (8 ft 11 in)
- Height: 2.64 m (8 ft 8 in)(hull)
- Crew: 2 (commander and driver) + 9 dismounts
- Armor: With bolt-on ceramic armor: all-around 14.5×114mm protection
- Main armament: XM813 30 mm autocannon (156 ready rounds)
- Secondary armament: M240C 7.62 mm coaxial machine gun (400 ready rounds)
- Engine: Caterpillar C7 turbo diesel 350 hp (336 kW)
- Suspension: 8×8 wheeled
- Operational range: 500 km (310 mi)
- Maximum speed: 100 km/h (62 mph)

The M1296 Infantry Carrier Vehicle Dragoon (ICVD) integrates a 30 mm XM813 Bushmaster II autocannon in a Kongsberg MCT-30 remote turret, significantly increasing its lethality over the standard Stryker Infantry Carrier Vehicle (ICV). First delivered to the U.S. Army in December 2017, it is operated by two crewman and can carry up to 9 dismounts.

== Double V-hull ==
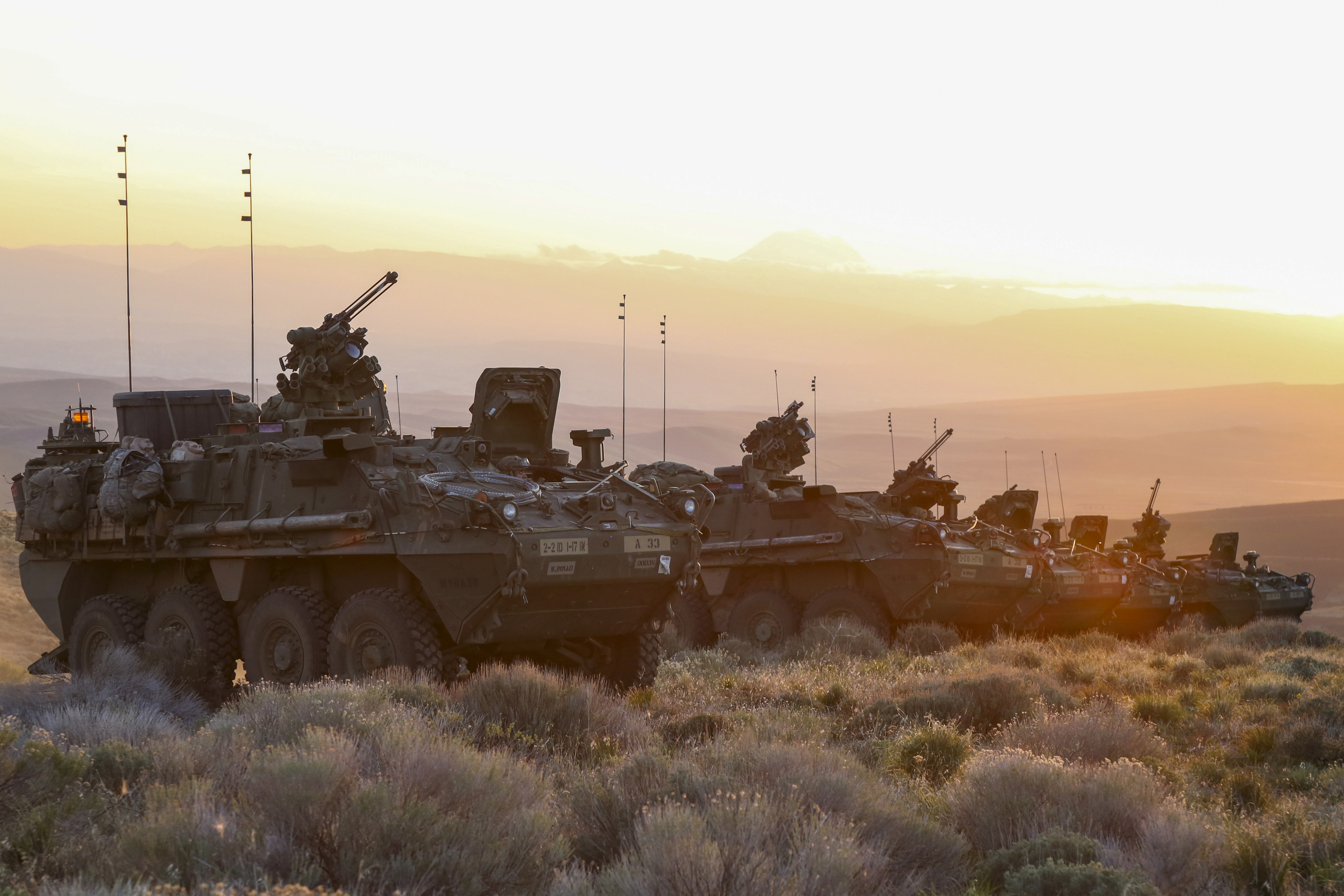
M1256 ICVV

In response to poor performance against improvised explosive devices (IEDs), the Army began manufacturing and retrofitting Stryker vehicles with a more survivable double V-hull designed underside. Seven Stryker versions are being produced in this configuration: the M1256 ICVV, M1252 MCVV, M1255CVV, M1251 FSVV, M1257 ESVV, M1254 MEVV and M1253 ATVV. Three variants are no longer in service: the M1127 reconnaissance vehicle is to be replaced by a scout variant of the ICVV (called the ICVV-S), the M1128 mobile gun system and the M1135 NBC reconnaissance vehicle have been removed.

=== Double V-hull A1 ===
The Double V-Hull A1 (DVH A1) is a modernized upgrade of the original Stryker Double V-Hull (DVH) variants, addressing key performance and capability needs. It replaces the 350-horsepower engine of the original DVH with a more powerful 450-horsepower Caterpillar C9 engine, significantly enhancing mobility and reducing engine strain during demanding operations. The electrical system has been upgraded to an air-cooled 910-amp alternator, supporting advanced electronics and future system integrations. Payload capacity has increased from 55,000 to 63,000 pounds, enabling greater versatility in carrying equipment and personnel. Enhanced situational awareness displays for both the driver and commander improve operational coordination and decision-making. The Stryker DVH-A1 vehicles have the following variants:

- M1251A1 FSVVA1: similar to the M1131 FSV, but with the improvements from the DVH-A1 modernization.
- M1252A1 MCVVA1: a DVH-A1 improved version of the M1129 mortar carrier. Armed with the Soltam 120 mm and Cardom recoil mortar system (RMS).
- M1253A1 ATVVA1: a DVH-A1 improved version of the M1134 ATGM. Equipped with a Precision Far Target Locator (pFTL), Image Enhancement (IE), an HD color camera, and an Upgraded TOW Missile Launcher (UTML), it can detect, identify, and engage targets at ranges exceeding 4.5 km with TOW missiles.
- M1254A1 MEVVA1: an improved version of the M1133 MEV, with DVH-A1 upgrades.
- M1255A1 CVVA1: a DVH-A1 improved version of the M1130 CV.
- M1256A1 ICVVA1: an improved version of the M1126 Stryker ICV, features a Double-V Hull A1 (DVH-A1) design and is equipped with an M153A4 CROWS-J, which can mount an FGM-148 Javelin missile in conjunction with either an M2 .50 caliber machine gun, M240 7.62 mm machine gun, or Mk-19 40 mm automatic grenade launcher.
- M1257A1 ESVVA1: a DVH-A1 improved version of the M1132 ESV. Equipped with a Surface Mine Plow, Magnetic Signature Duplicator, and an M153A4 CROWS-J with Javelin ATGM.
- M1304 ICVVA1-30mm: replaces the M1296 Dragoon, it has the same improvements as the other DVHA1 variants and is equipped with a new unmanned turret, based on the Rafael Samson Pro turret, which is armed with the 30mm XM813 Chain Gun and a coaxial 7.62mm M240C. The M1304 also features 3rd-generation thermal optics for both the gunner and commander that offer a hunter-killer function for day and night operations.

== Experimental ==
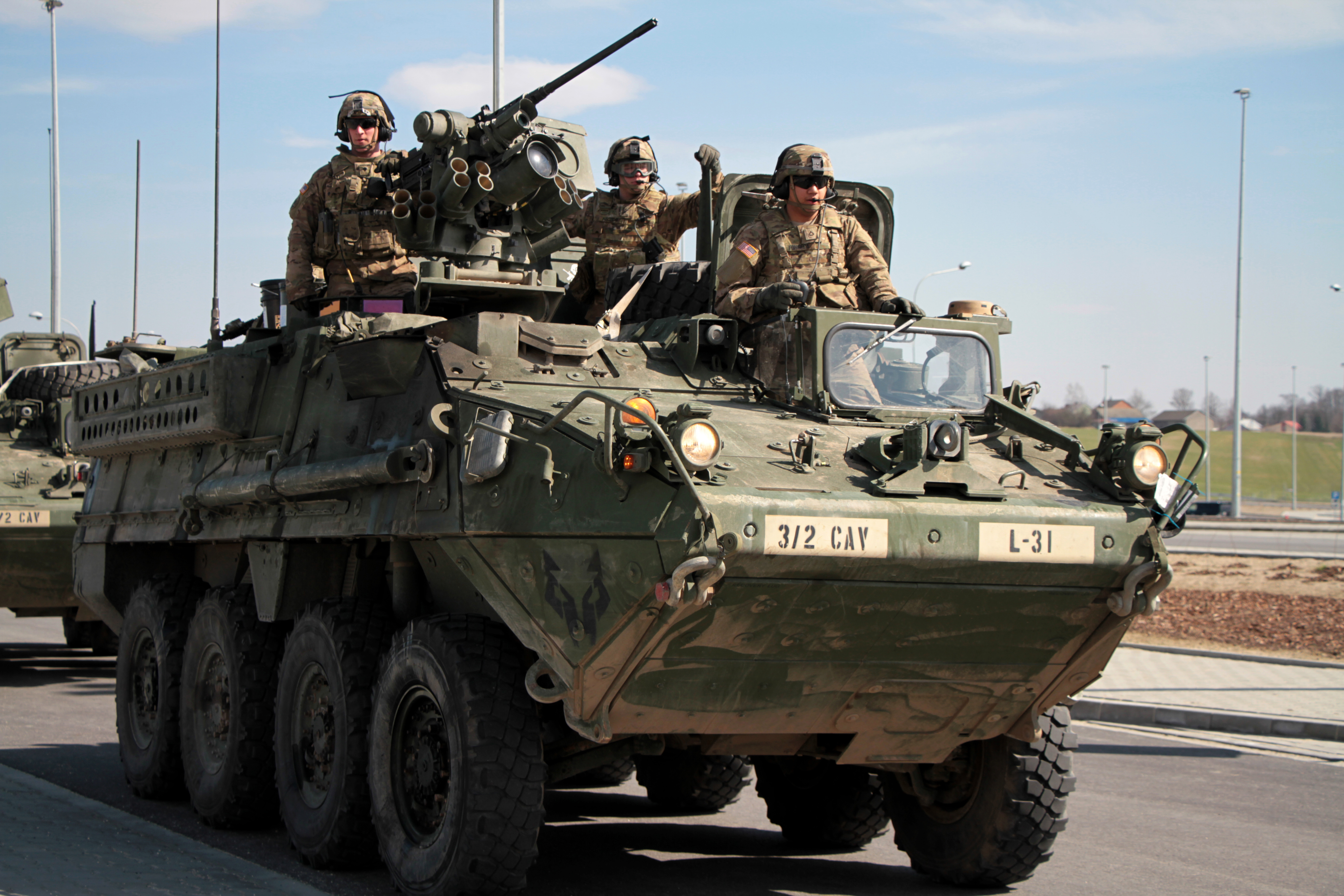
U.S. Army 3rd Squadron, 2nd Cavalry Regiment soldiers in a Stryker

- Stryker self-propelled howitzer (SPH): Army officials considered a self-propelled howitzer variant when drafting its requirements for the IAV program. Officials ultimately passed over the SPH requirement when it determined the service would be unable to afford the expense and risk. The service settled on the M198 howitzer for its artillery requirement, later to be replaced by the M777 howitzer that was then under development. General Dynamics later produced this variant with a turret and ammunition developed by Denel Land Systems. Work stopped after the successful November 2005 demonstration of the prototype.
- Stryker maintenance recovery vehicle (MRV): An armored recovery vehicle based on a Stryker hull. Equipped with a Rotzler TR 200 winch, Magnum 210M crane and hydraulic earth anchor.
- Tracked Stryker: For the Army's Armored Multi-Purpose Vehicle (AMPV) program to replace the M113 APC, General Dynamics created a tracked version of the Stryker. The vehicle kept the highly survivable Double-V hull, and tracks were attached using externally mounted suspension. It was considerably heavier at 70,000 pounds (35 tons, 31,800 kg), but the tracked suspension could handle up to 84,000 lb (42 tons, 38,100 kg) to allow for additional armor, weapons, and cargo. Its powerplant offered 700 horsepower and the vehicle had greater than 60 percent commonality with wheeled Strykers. The Tracked Stryker also had greater fuel efficiency and a wider track for better mobility than the M113. With the suspension mounted externally and the elimination of axles, the Double-V hull's survivability could have been even more effective, as the wheeled version required an interruption in the V-hull to accept axles. The Tracked Stryker was to have competed against the BAE Systems Turretless Bradley, but serious efforts on developing the tracked version never materialized because the cost needed to modify the vehicle to meet requirements was too high.
- Stryker launched assault bridge: German manufacturer Krauss-Maffei Wegmann (KMW) proposed a bridgelaying version of the Stryker that enables tactical vehicles with little or no gap-crossing capabilities to move over divides. The 12 m (39 ft)-long bridge is carried atop the Stryker with hydraulic arms at the front position to launch it and have it in place within two minutes. It can support vehicles weighing up to 40 tons and allow them to cross 11 m (36 ft) gaps.
- Stryker mobile expeditionary high-energy laser (MEHEL): The Army is integrating a directed energy weapon onto the M1131 Fire Support Vehicle version to defend against Group 1 and 2 UAVs (up to 55 lb (25 kg)-class) for mobile forces as the first-ever integration of an Army laser weapon onto a combat vehicle. In an April 2016 test, a 2 kW laser fired from the Stryker shot down 21 drone targets. The vehicle has an electronic warfare jamming system to scramble drone command signals. A 5 kW version could be operational in 2017, with plans to increase power to 18 kW by 2018.
- Other Stryker SHORAD variants: In August 2017, Boeing and General Dynamics unveiled mobile SHORAD launcher (MSL) fitted with an Avenger turret for short-range air defense and operated by a three-man crew. The turret replaces the passenger compartment. Standard FIM-92 Stinger pod can be switched with launcher rails to fire Longbow Hellfire and AIM-9X Sidewinder missiles. In October 2017, Orbital ATK unveiled the Stryker Anti-UAV Defense System (AUDS), combining electronic-scanning radar target detection, EO tracking/classification, and directional RF inhibition capability coupled with a M230LF 30 mm cannon loaded with advanced airburst and guided ammunition suite. The package creates a mobile C-UAV system capable of lethally or non-lethally defeating small drones at ranges of up to 8 km (5.0 mi), and can defeat Group 1 micro UAVs as far as 2 km (1.2 mi) out. The system is also called the Tactical-Robotic Exterminator. In June 2018, the Army ordered 144 converted Stryker M-SHORAD vehicles to be delivered by 2022; the configuration with a modified Avenger turret was not chosen.

== Synopsis of variants ==
- M1126 infantry carrier vehicle (ICV): The basic armored personnel carrier version, which provides protected transport for two crew and a nine-man infantry squad, and can support dismounted infantry. It weighs 19 tons; communications include text and a map network between vehicles. It can be armed with 12.7 mm M2 Browning machine gun, 40 mm Mk 19 grenade launcher or 7.62 mm M240 machine gun.
  - M1126 infantry carrier vehicle DVH-Scout (ICVV-S): A reconnaissance version of the ICV fitted with an internally mounted long-range advance scout (LRAS) surveillance system and the double v-hull.
- M1127 reconnaissance vehicle (RV): A version used by RSTA squadrons and battalion scouts, moving throughout the battlefield to gather and transmit real time intelligence/surveillance for situational awareness. The RV's purpose is to anticipate and avert threats, improving the brigade's decisiveness and freedom of maneuver.

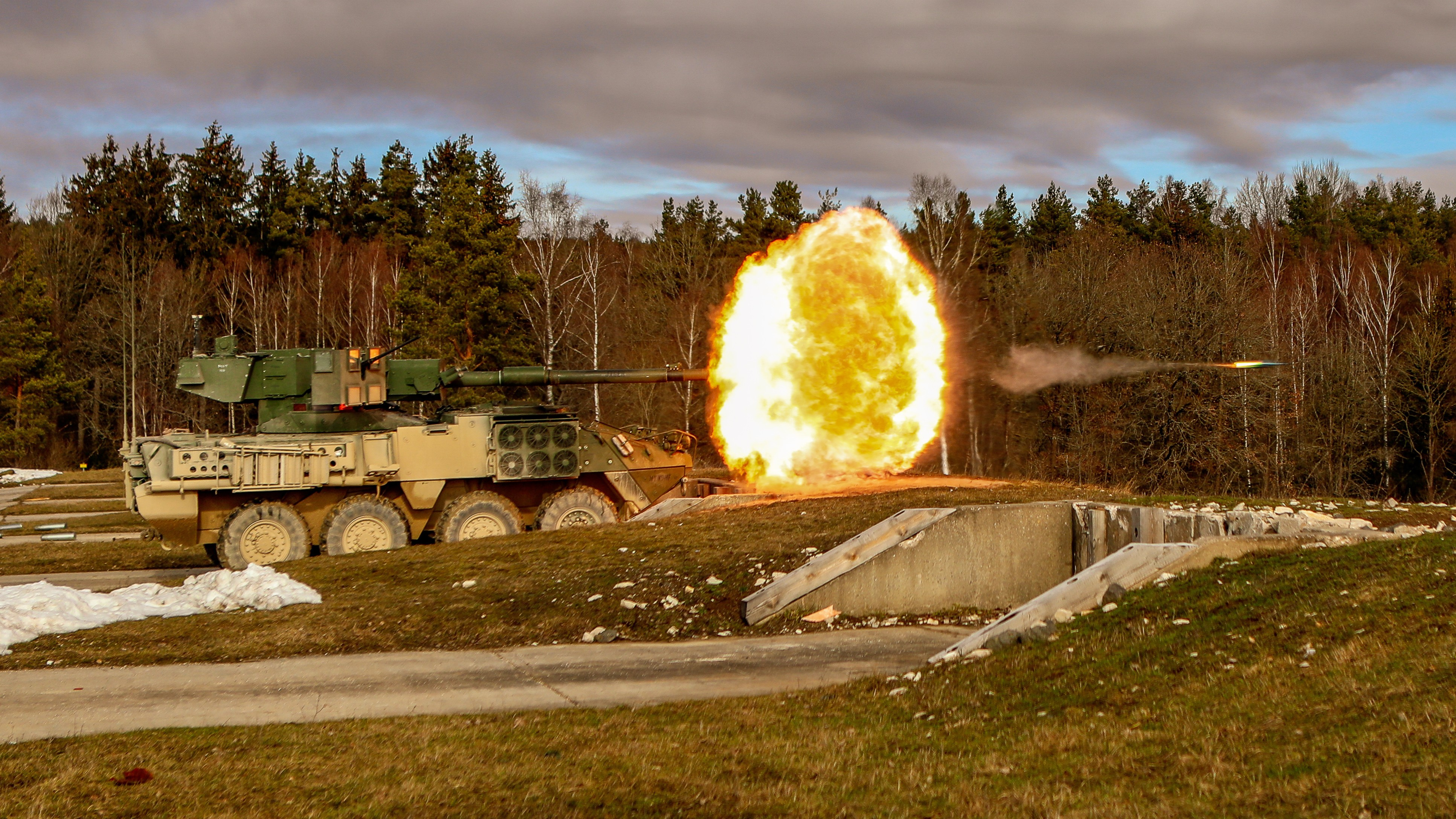
M1128 MGS firing

- M1128 mobile gun system (MGS): A version armed with an 105 mm M68A1E4 rifled cannon, a 7.62 mm M240 machine gun mounted coaxially, a 12.7 mm M2 commander's machine gun and two M6 smoke grenade launchers. The M68A1E4 also features a muzzle brake to assist with recoil and an autoloader, a rare feature on US tank guns. The main gun provides direct fire in support of infantry, engaging stationary and mobile enemy targets, such as bunkers or armored vehicles to create a combined arms effect of overmatched firepower that improves survivability of the combat team. It has a rate of fire of six rounds per minute, and carries 400 rounds of 0.5 in (12.7 mm) caliber and 3,400 rounds of 7.62 mm ammunition, and the same C4ISR communications and driver's vision as the ICV. The MGS vehicle is a strengthened variant of the LAV III compared to the standard variant other Stryker vehicles are based on, but retains commonality across all vehicles in the family. The Stryker MGS was retired at the end of 2022, due in part to the expense and difficulty of maintaining and upgrading the autoloader.

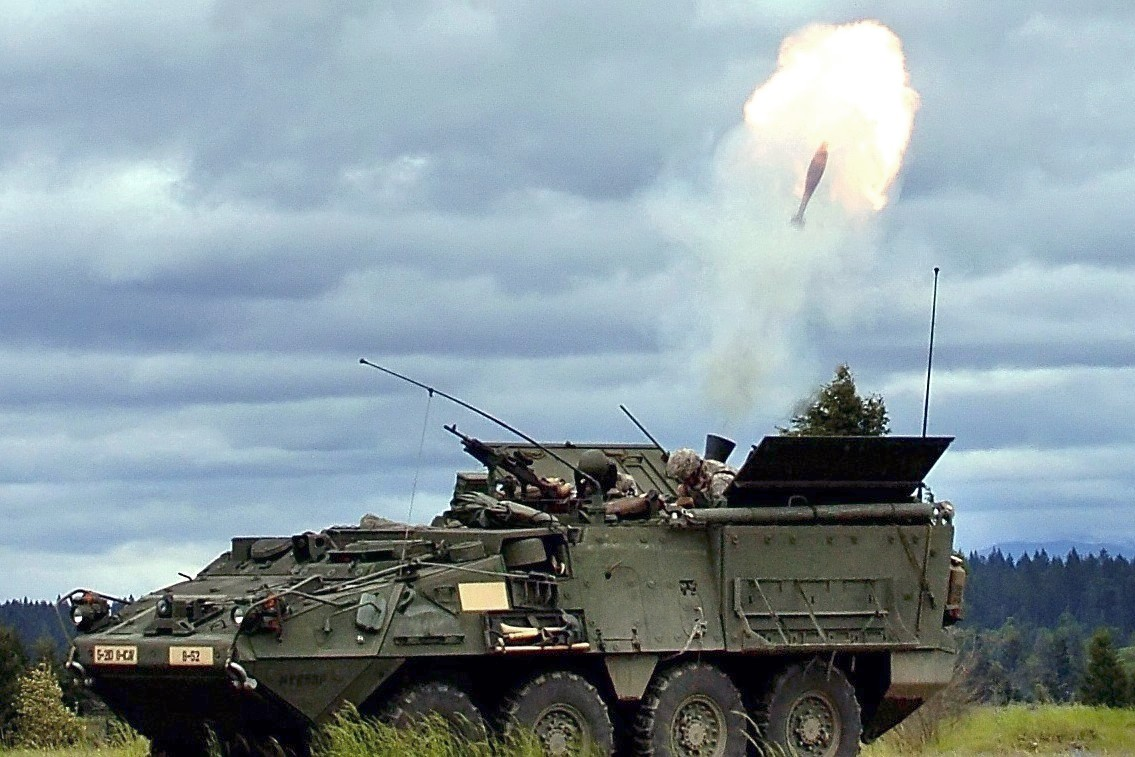
120 mm mortar fired from Stryker MCV-B variant

- M1129 mortar carrier (MC): armed with Soltam 120 mm and Cardom recoil mortar system (RMS), this version provides indirect fire support to fellow infantry with screening obscurants, suppressive forces and on-call supporting fires including HE, illumination, IR illumination, smoke, precision guided, and DPICM cluster bombs. The XM395 precision guided mortar munition (PGMM) can be used to attack point targets at extended ranges with GPS guidance. Vehicles at battalion level also carry the 81 mm mortar for dismounted use, while company mortar vehicles carry the 60 mm mortar.
- M1130 commander's vehicle (CV): This vehicle provides commanders with communication, data, and control functions to analyze and prepare information for combat missions; it can also link to aircraft antenna/power for planning missions while aboard transport aircraft. They are deployed as three vehicles per brigade headquarters, two per battalion headquarters and two per infantry company.
- M1131 fire support vehicle (FSV): This version is organic to maneuver companies and provides surveillance and communications (4 secure combat radio nets), with target acquisition/identification/tracking/designation being transmitted automatically to the shooting units.
- M1132 engineer squad vehicle (ESV): This vehicle provides mobility and limited counter mobility support. Integrated into the ESV are obstacle neutralization and lane marking systems and mine detection devices. The ESV with its attachments provides a partial solution to the obstacle clearance role, primarily for clearance of hastily emplaced mines on hard surfaces and rubble, plus will enable the Engineer squad to control future robotic based systems.
- M1133 medical evacuation vehicle (MEV): This is used as the en route care platform for brigade units, part of the battalion aid station, providing treatment for serious injury and advanced trauma as an integrated part of the combat forward formation. An attendant's seat allows the attendant to change position and visually monitor all patients while the vehicle is in motion. Medical personnel must be seated for safety while the vehicle is in motion, but able to visually monitor patients. Geneva Convention markings can be masked/removed as required.

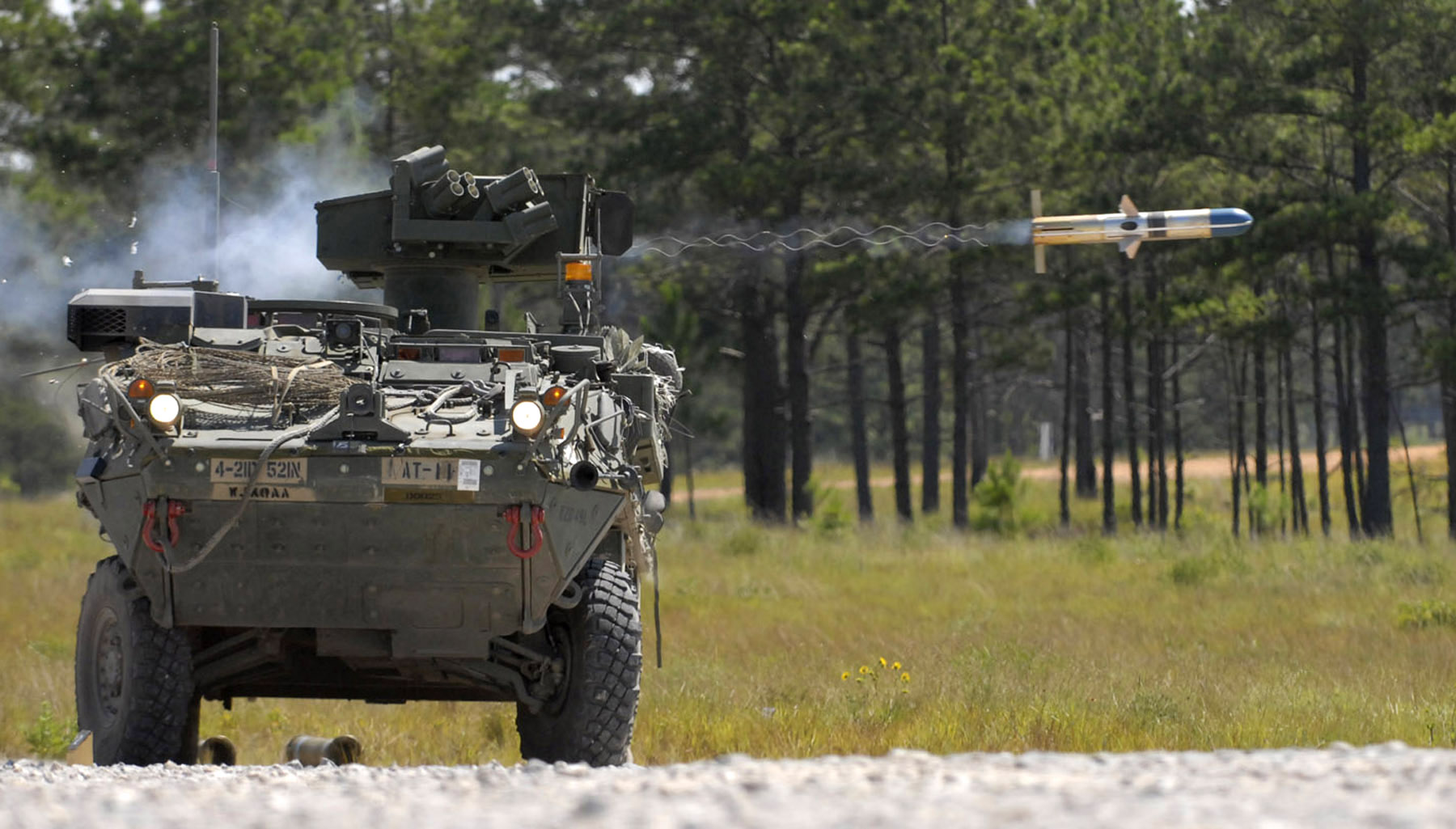
Anti-tank guided missile vehicle

- M1134 anti-tank guided missile vehicle (ATGM): It is a missile vehicle armed with the TOW missile to reinforce the brigade's infantry and reconnaissance, providing long-range anti-tank fires against armor beyond tank gun effective range. The separate anti-tank company can also be used to shape the battlefield, reinforce the infantry battalions and reconnaissance squadron (e.g. counter-reconnaissance), serve as a reserve, and of course may counterattack. Vehicle commanders independently locate secondary targets while the gunner is engaging the primary. After ready rounds are fired, crewman will need to rearm the launcher. A vehicle commander, gunner, loader, and driver operate the ATGM in a tactical environment and to carry equipment if the missile launcher is used in a dismounted mode.

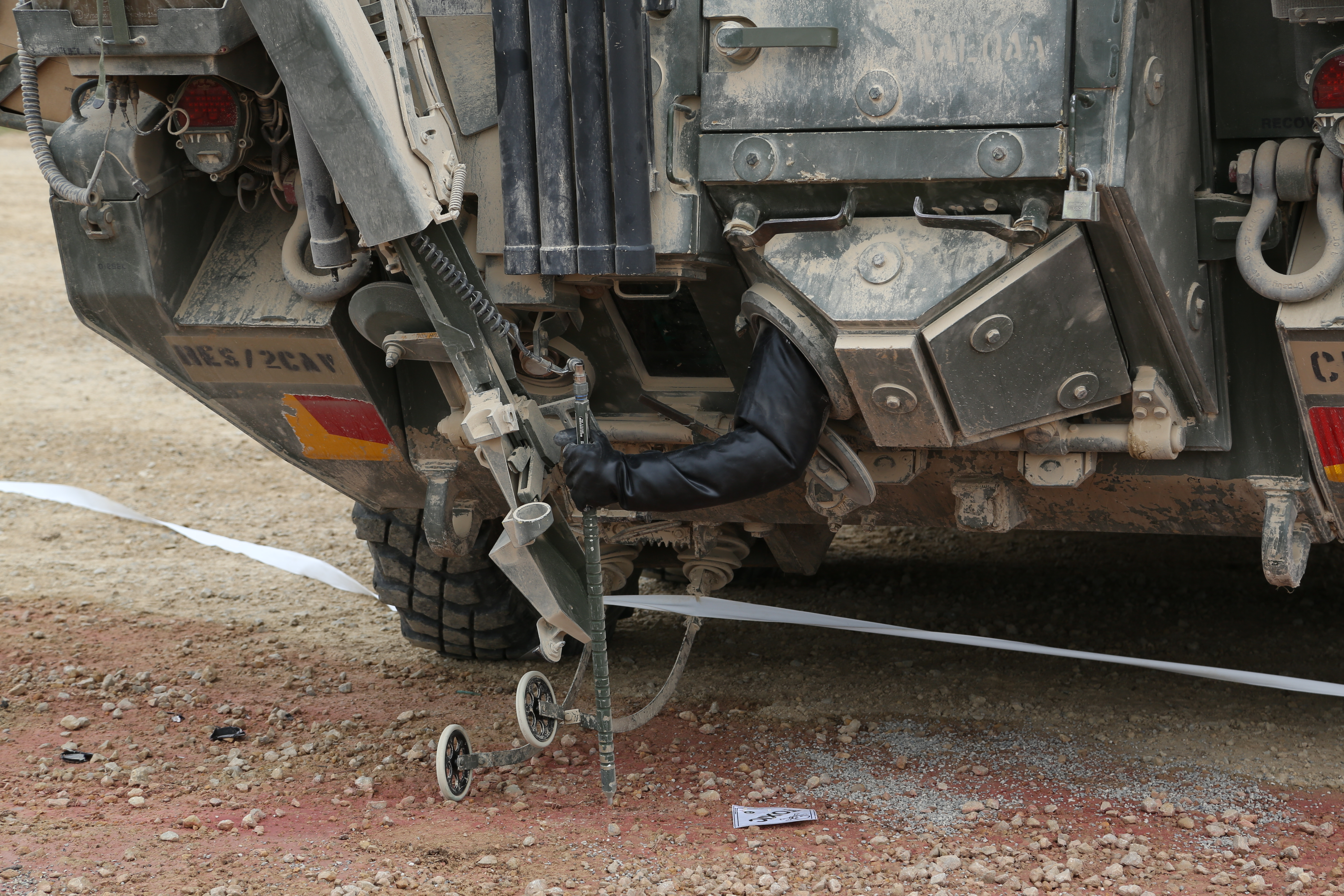
US Army NBCRV conducting soil testing

- M1135 nuclear, biological, chemical, reconnaissance vehicle (NBCRV): This vehicle automatically integrates contamination information from detectors with input from navigation and meteorological systems and transmits digital NBC warning messages to warn follow-on forces. The core of the NBC RV is its onboard integrated NBC sensor suite and integrated meteorological system. An NBC positive overpressure system minimizes cross-contamination of samples and detection instruments, provides crew protection, and allows extended operations at MOPP 0.

== See also ==
- List of U.S. military vehicles by model number
- Variants of the M113 armored personnel carrier

== Sources ==
- "Infantry Carrier Vehicle". Archived from the original on 2008-05-16.
- "Reconnaissance variant". Archived from the original on 2008-05-16.
- "Mortar Carrier". Archived from the original on 2008-05-16.
- "Commander's Vehicle". Archived from the original on 2008-05-16.
- "Fire Support Vehicle". Archived from the original on 2008-05-16.
- "Engineer Squad Vehicle". Archived from the original on 2008-05-16.
- "Medical Evacuation Vehicle". Archived from the original on 2008-05-16.
