= Joint Service Lightweight Integrated Suit Technology =

United States Armed Forces chemical protective suit

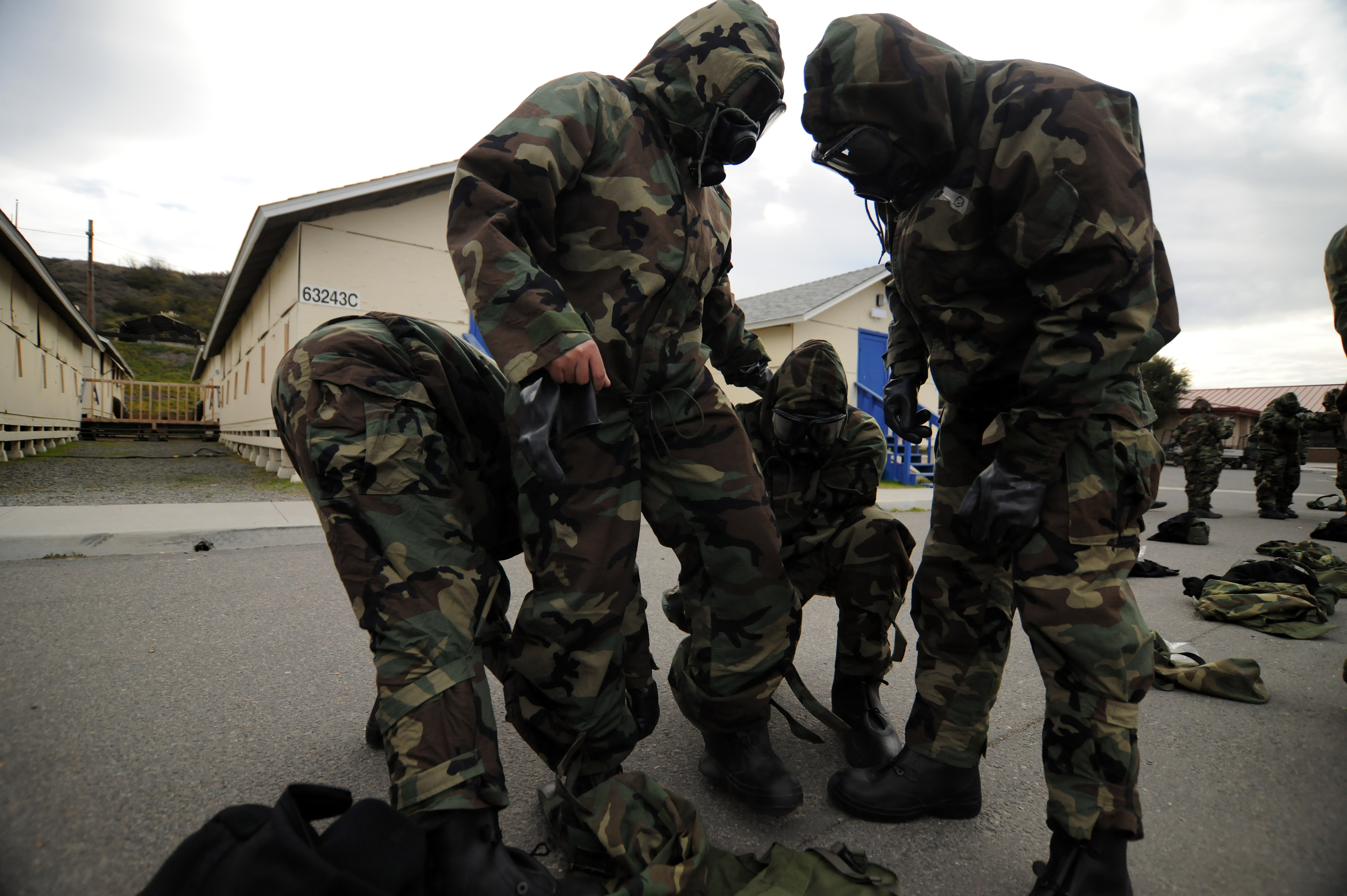
US Navy medical training students don JSLIST MOPP ensembles.

Joint Service Lightweight Integrated Suit Technology (JSLIST), also known as Advanced Chemical Protective Garment (ACPG) by the U.S. Navy, is a suit used by the U.S. Military for protection against CBRN hazards. It is part of the MOPP ensemble. The JSLIST is made to be worn over the Battle Dress Uniform. The suit consists of lightweight chemical and biological protective clothing consisting of a two-piece suit, overboots, gloves, and respiratory equipment. The suit is air permeable to allow breathing to help with the user's comfort and reduce heat stress. The JSLIST has a 120-day service life when removed from packaging, can be worn for 45 consecutive days in an uncontaminated environment, and can be cleaned up to 6 times.

== History ==
In 1993, command groups from the Marine Corps, Navy, Army, and Air Force signed an agreement that created the JSLIST program, to replace the Chemical Protection Overgarment used by the U.S. Navy. The JSLIST program worked on creating, testing, and manufacturing a better and unified CBRN protective suit for a reduced cost. The U.S. Military started procurement of the JSLIST in 1997.

== Components ==
The JSLIST Overgarment includes the coat and trousers. Both pieces are made from 50/50 nylon/cotton rip-stop material with a waterproof coating for the outer material. The inner material includes an activated charcoal layer. The overgarment comes in desert and woodland camouflage. The trousers have bellows pockets, adjustable suspenders and waistband, and a slide fastener with protective flap. The coat is waist long, has a slide fastener and protective flap, and has an integral hood. Multipurpose Rain, Snow, and CB overboot (MOLO) are used for footwear for the ensemble. Butyl gloves and respiratory equipment are also used to complete the suit. Military personnel often wrap M9 Detector Tape around the biceps, wrists and trouser legs of the JSLIST for chemical agent detection.

== Joint Firefighter Integrated Response Ensemble ==
Joint Firefighter Integrated Response Ensemble (J-FIRE) is a military protective suit used for firefighting in the CBRN and WMD environment. J-FIRE utilizes the JSLIST and an aluminized firefighting proximity suit. The J-FIRE is designed to resist water and standard firefighting chemicals, while still providing CBRN protection to the user. The U.S. Army started use of the J-FIRE suit in 1997.

== See also ==
- OZK (CBRN suit) - Soviet/Russian Armed forces NBC suit.
- NBC suit
