= OZK (CBRN suit) =

Soviet NBC suit

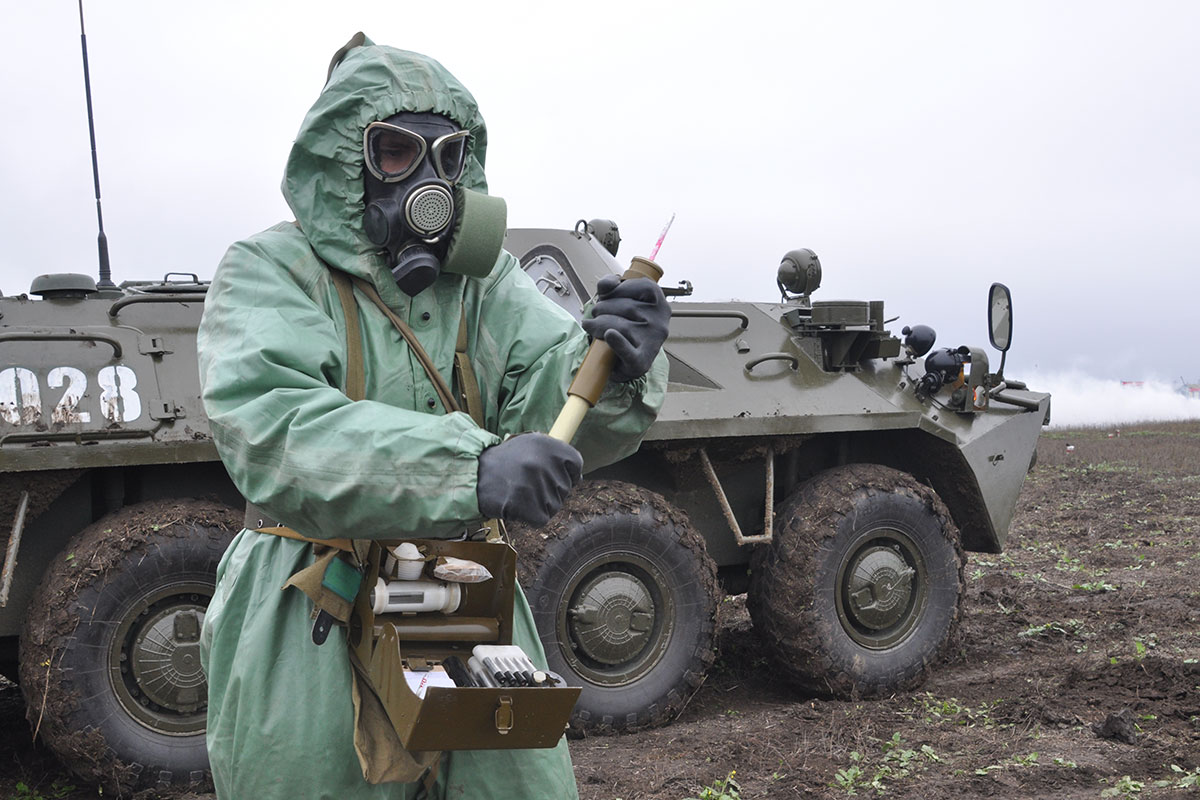
- Russian serviceman wearing an OZK suit with PMK-2 gas mask
- Type: NBC suit
- Place of origin: Soviet Union

Service history
- In service: 1958 - present
- Used by: Soviet Armed Forces; Russian Armed Forces

Specifications
- Weight: ~ 3 kg coat - 1.6 kg overboots - 0.8-1.2 kg gloves - 350 g

Combined arms Protective Kit (Note: Russian: Общевойсковой Защитный Комплект, romanized: Obshhevojskovoj Zashhitnyj Komplekt, lit. 'Combined arms Protective kit') better known by its acronym OZK is a combined arms standard issue NBC suit of the Soviet and Russian Armed Forces. It is designed to protect the skin of personnel from toxic substances, radioactive particles, and biological agents, as well as to reduce the likelihood of contamination of uniforms, equipment, footwear, and personal weapons.

== Components ==
OZK consists of several main parts:

1. Protective coat OP-1M (ОП-1М). The protective Coat is made of a special heat-resistant rubberized fabric. Can be used both as a cloak and as a coverall suit. There is a flap at the top of the hood that allows you to adjust its size when used with various hats or helmets. The outer side of the raincoat has a gray or salad color, the inner side is white; if necessary, it can be turned inside out, and the pegs can be adjusted 180 degrees, as a result, the user receives a winter camouflage coat, which can be used in a snowy area.
2. Protective gloves BL-1M (БЛ-1М), five-fingered. Made out of rubber (butyl rubber).
3. Winter protective gloves BZ-1M (БЗ-1М), three-fingered. Previously, two-fingered gloves made of rubberized fabric were used, they can be found in old kits that have been removed from storage.
4. Protective overboots. Boots are made of rubberized fabric. The soles are reinforced with a rubber base. They are worn over regular shoes. Each stocking is stretched over the leg with three straps and thus attached to the leg, and with a textile ribbon to the waist belt.
5. Sheath for the protective coat.
6. Bag for the gloves and overboots.

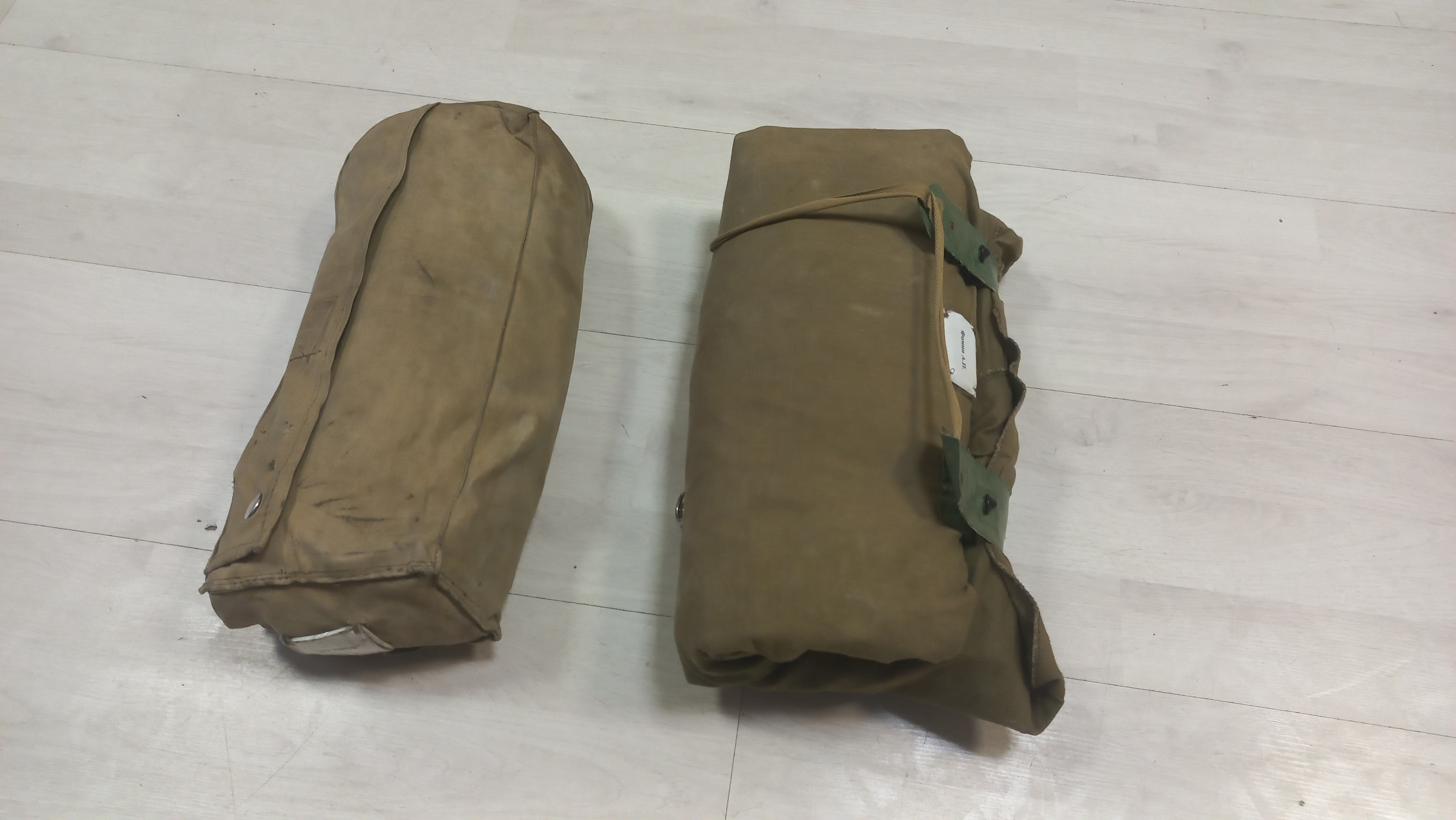
OZK suit rolled up in a sheath, bag with boots and gloves on the left.

The suit comes in several sizes:

- 1 height — for people up to 160 cm tall;
- 2 height — from 166 to 170 cm;
- 3 height — from 171 to 175 cm;
- 4 height — from 176 to 180 cm;
- 5 height — 181 cm and above.

Boots:

- 1 — for boots of sizes 37-40;
- 2 — for the 41st and 42nd;
- 3 — for size 43 or more.

== Use ==
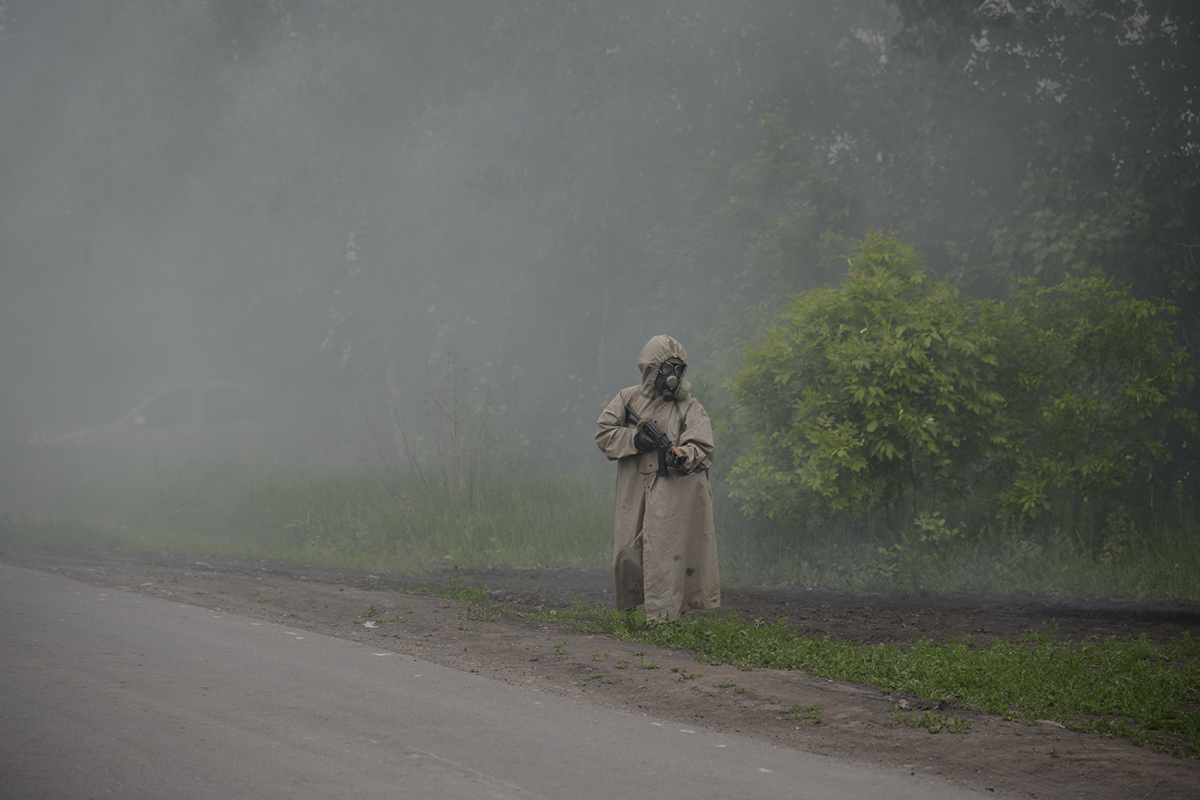
Russian serviceman wearing an OZK as a coat with a PMK-2 gas mask

OZK was adopted into service some time between 1956 and 1962, most likely in 1958.

Each OZK is individually assigned to a serviceman, as evidenced by a tag that is attached to the sheath of the raincoat and to the overboots bag. To recognize a serviceman wearing an OZK, shoulder straps with military rank insignia are drawn on the coat sleeve with a pen (felt-tip pen, marker); for the enlisted personnel, a figure is drawn indicating his ordinal number in the unit.

Russian and Soviet NBC protection troops have standards (norms) of suiting up in an OZK:

- Norm № 3a: Donning an OZK in the form of a coat and a gas mask. (On command: "Put on Coat in the sleeves, Overboots, Gloves. Gases!") Individual results: Excellent - 3 min; Good - 3 min 20 sec; Satisfactory - 4 min.
- Norm № 3b: Donning an OZK in the form of a coverall. (On command: "Put on Protective kit, Gases!") Individual results: Excellent - 4 min 35 sec; Good - 5 min; Satisfactory - 6 min.
- Norm № 8: Actions on the "Chemical alarm" signal. (On command: "Chemical alarm") Individual results: Excellent - 40 sec; Good - 45 min; Satisfactory - 55 min.

Prolonged wearing of OZK is impossible due to the fact that the air circulation inside it is closed, and staying in such an atmosphere can lead to various complications with the skin of a serviceman, which can affect his overall combat capability. According to the standard, the duration of stay in the OZK should not exceed 4 hours. In addition, the standard time spent in the suit is significantly reduced when the surrounding temperature increases.

== See also ==
- Joint Service Lightweight Integrated Suit Technology - US Armed forces NBC suit.
- NBC suit
