= MOPP (protective gear) =

Protective gear used by U.S. military personnel in a toxic environment

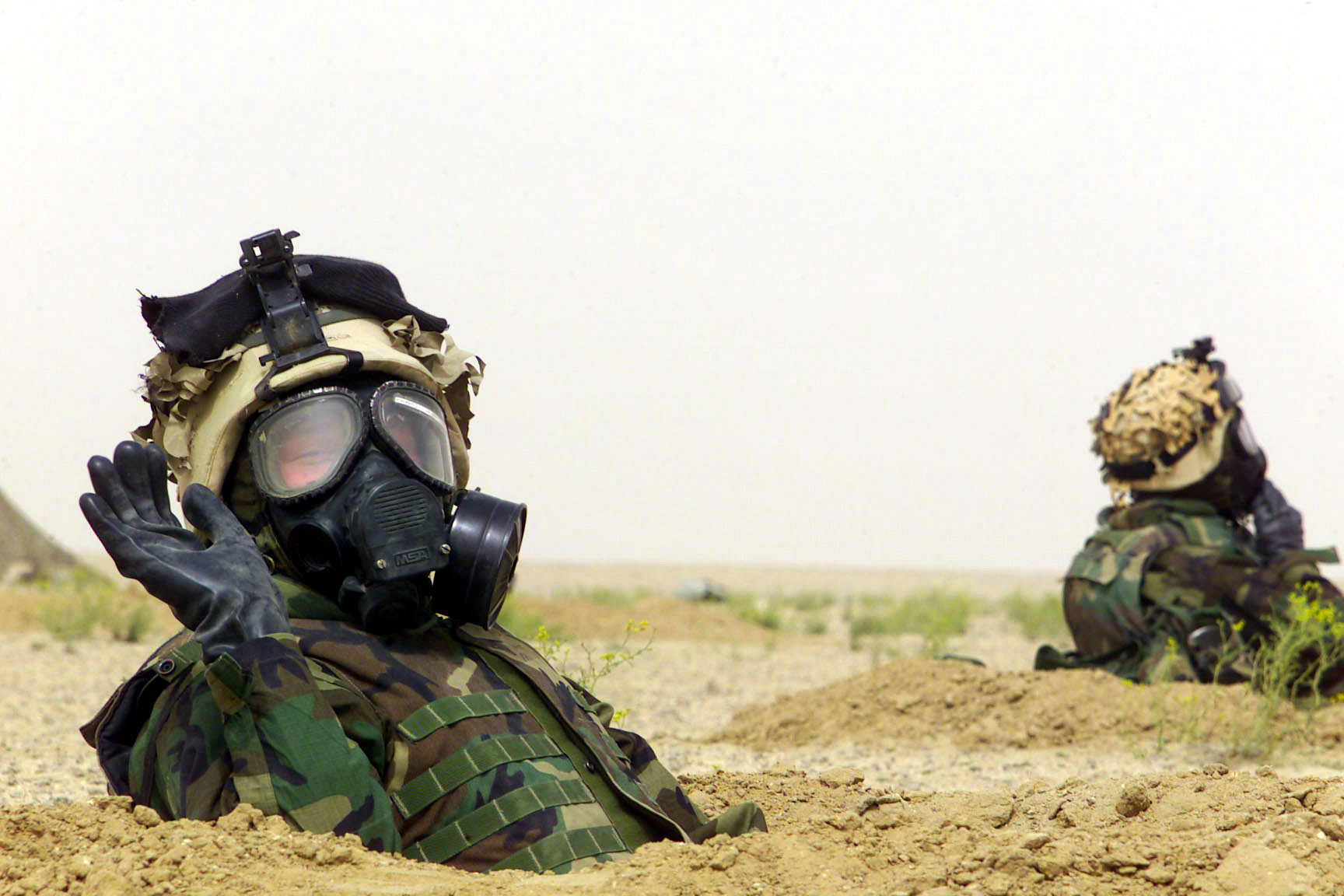
U.S. Marines in MOPP 4 gear during the 2003 invasion of Iraq

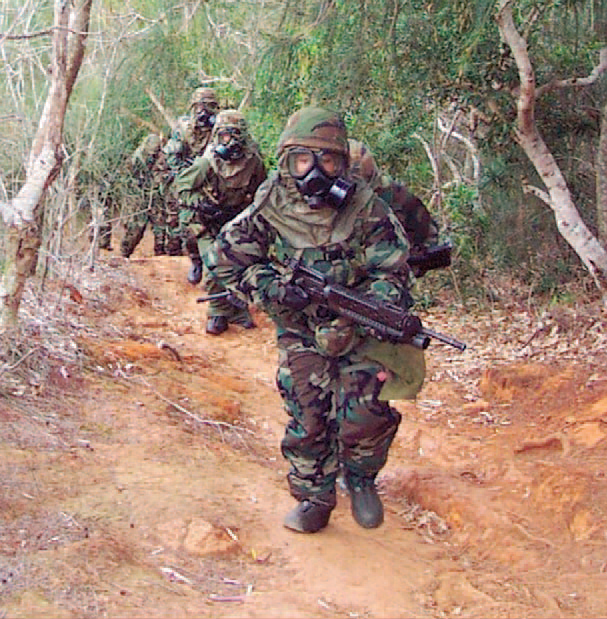
U.S. Army soldiers test MOPP 4 gear at the Yuma Proving Ground's Tropic Regions Test Center in Hawaii

MOPP (Mission Oriented Protective Posture; pronounced "mop") is protective gear used by U.S. military personnel in a toxic environment, for example, during a chemical, biological, radiological, or nuclear (CBRN) strike.

== Protective equipment ==
- Protective mask – Commonly referred to as a gas mask or pro mask. It is designed to filter harmful chemical and biological agents, as well as irradiated particles from the air to allow the wearer to breathe safely. No protective masks filter out gases such as carbon monoxide, and in situations requiring that level of protection, external breathing apparatus is employed.
- Mask carrier – Protects the mask from damage. It is usually worn as part of battle gear for easy access and usually contains a technical manual, extra filter, spare parts, chemical detection papers, and nerve agent antidote kits (NAAK).
- Over garments – Joint Service Lightweight Integrated Suit Technology (JSLIST) Specially designed clothing to be worn over the normal uniform. These garments are designed to allow maximum airflow for cooling while keeping chemical and biological agents from reaching the skin of the wearer. Some are equipped with a charcoal lining to neutralize some agents. Military personnel often equip over garments with strips of M9 Detector Paper to identify chemical agents on the battlefield they might come in contact with.
- M9 Detector paper is worn to detect chemical liquid agents that a service member may brush against while in MOPP gear. It is worn in three different areas of the suit: the biceps, wrists and shins. It can also be placed on vehicles or equipment for detection purposes.
- Gloves and overboots – (JSLIST) Highly durable rubber, designed with combat operations in mind. Used to prevent contact with agents.

== MOPP protection levels ==
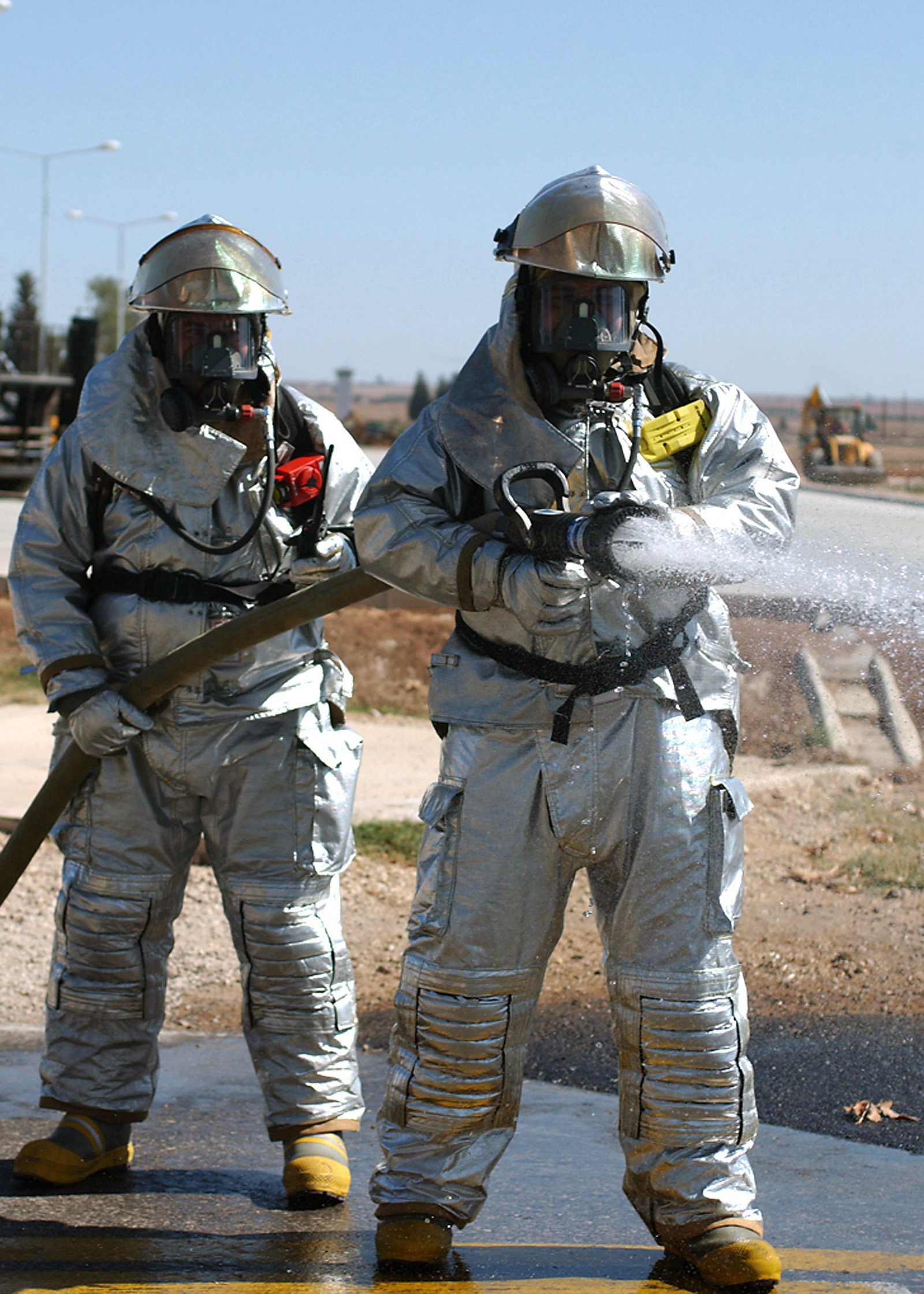
Turkish Firefighters in MOPP 4 level gear during an exercise held at Incirlik Air Base, Turkey

Each MOPP level corresponds to an increasing level of protection. The readiness level will usually be dictated by the in-theatre commander.

- Mask Only – Protective mask is carried.
- MOPP Ready – Protective mask is carried. First set of suit, gloves, and boots are available within two hours, second set within six hours.
- MOPP Level 0 – Worn: nothing. Carried: Protective mask. Immediately Available: suit, boots and gloves.
- MOPP Level 1 – Worn: suit. Carried: Protective mask. Immediately Available: boots and gloves
- MOPP Level 2 – Worn: suit and boots. Carried: Protective mask and gloves.
- MOPP Level 3 – Worn: suit, boots and mask. Carried: gloves.
- MOPP Level 4 – All protection worn.

== MOPP Restrictions ==
- Physical Factors – Personnel wearing MOPP gear for extended periods of time can experience heat exhaustion, dehydration, rapid breathing (hyperventilation) or heart rate (tachycardia), nausea, and cramps.
- Psychological Factors – Extended use of MOPP gear can have major psychological effects such as irritability, fatigue, feelings of alienation or helplessness, claustrophobia, forgetfulness, impaired judgement, disorientation, and in extreme cases, hallucinations.
- Five Senses – Skills tied to the senses, such as hand coordination, clear vision, and speaking, will not work as effectively.
- Personal Needs – MOPP gear makes it impossible for individuals to perform personal needs such as caring for wounds, personal hygiene, sleep, eliminate bodily waste, and eating. Although it is possible to drink using a drinking tube, eating is impossible in MOPP.
- Work Rate – Physical and psychological factors greatly reduce work rate in MOPP. Work rest cycles should be implemented based on the level of MOPP and the wet bulb and dry bulb temperatures.

== See also ==
- Fallout shelter – Space protecting occupants from radioactive debris
- NBC suit – Type of military personal protective equipment
- CBRN defense – Protective measures against hazardous materials warfare (Chemical, Biological, Radiological, and Nuclear, known formerly as NBC)
