= NBC suit =

Type of military personal protective equipment

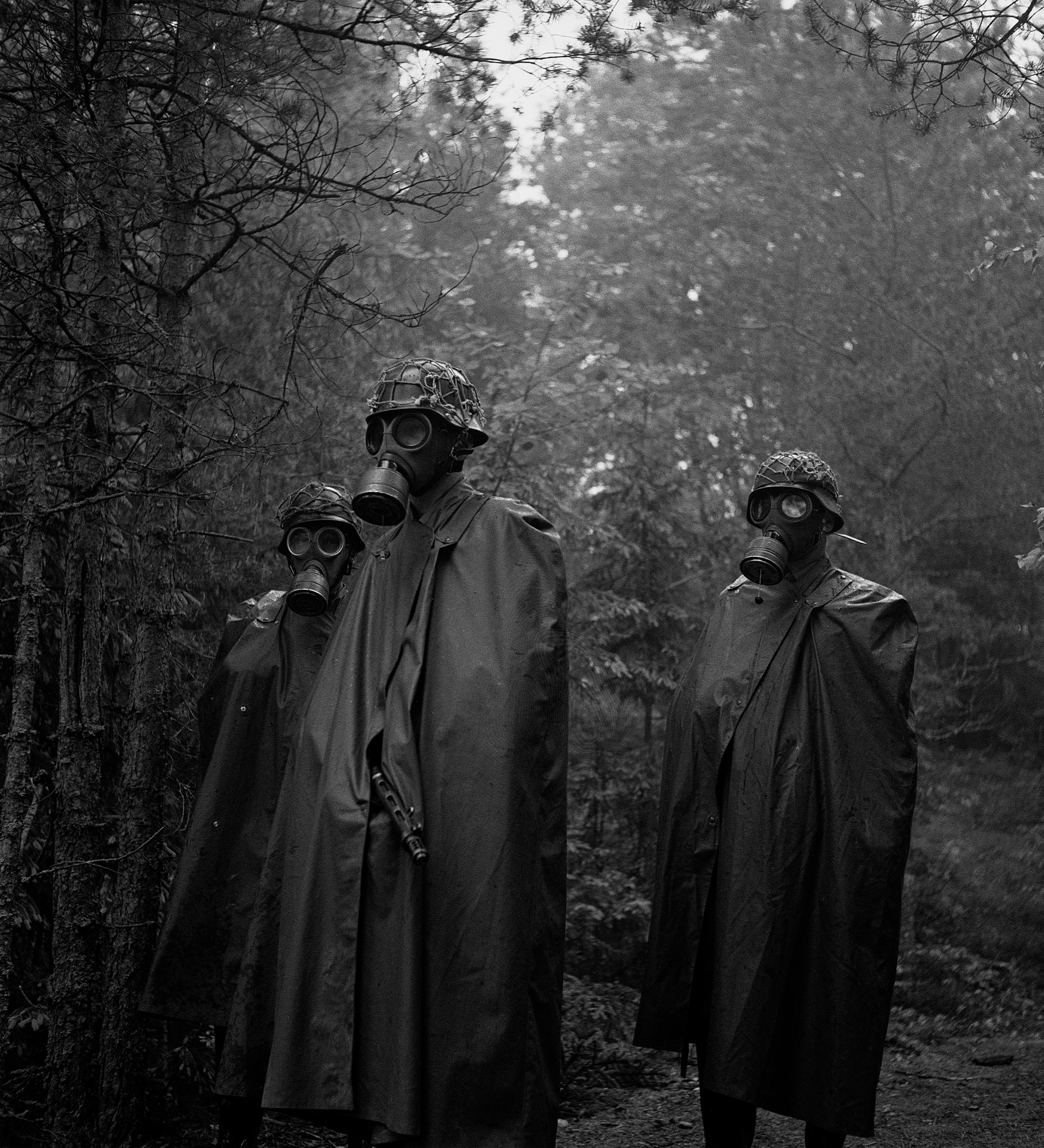
Finnish soldiers in NBC gear, 1961

An NBC (nuclear, biological, chemical) suit, also known as a chem suit, or chemical suit is a type of military personal protective equipment. NBC suits are designed to provide protection against direct contact with and contamination by radioactive, biological, or chemical substances, and provide protection from contamination with radioactive materials and all types of radiation. They are generally designed to be worn for extended periods to allow the wearer to fight (or generally function) while under threat of or under actual nuclear, biological, or chemical attack. The civilian equivalent is the hazmat suit. The term NBC has been replaced by CBRN (chemical, biological, radiological, nuclear), with the addition of the new threat of radiological weapons.

== Use ==
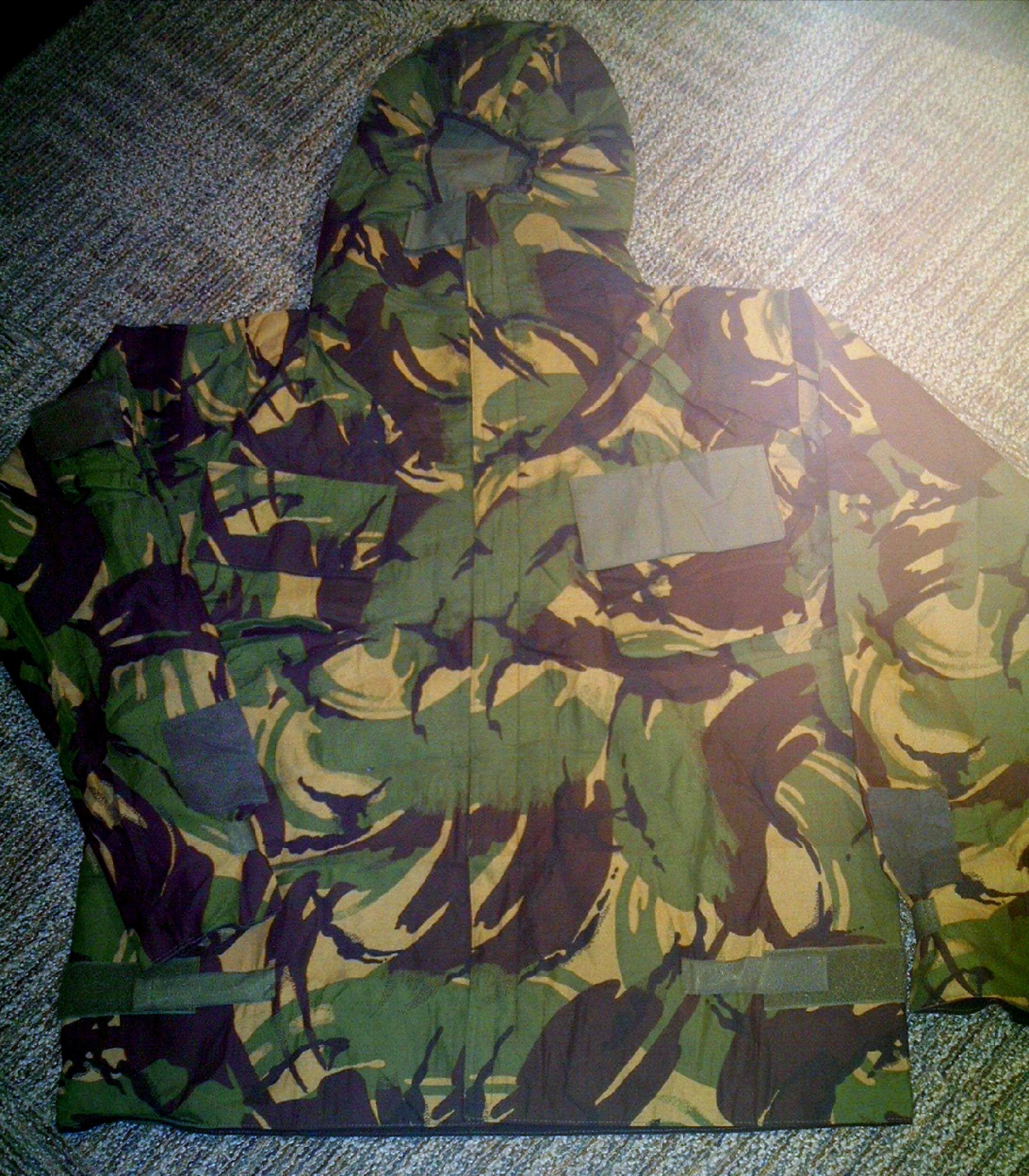
Smock of British military NBC suit in Disruptive Pattern Material.

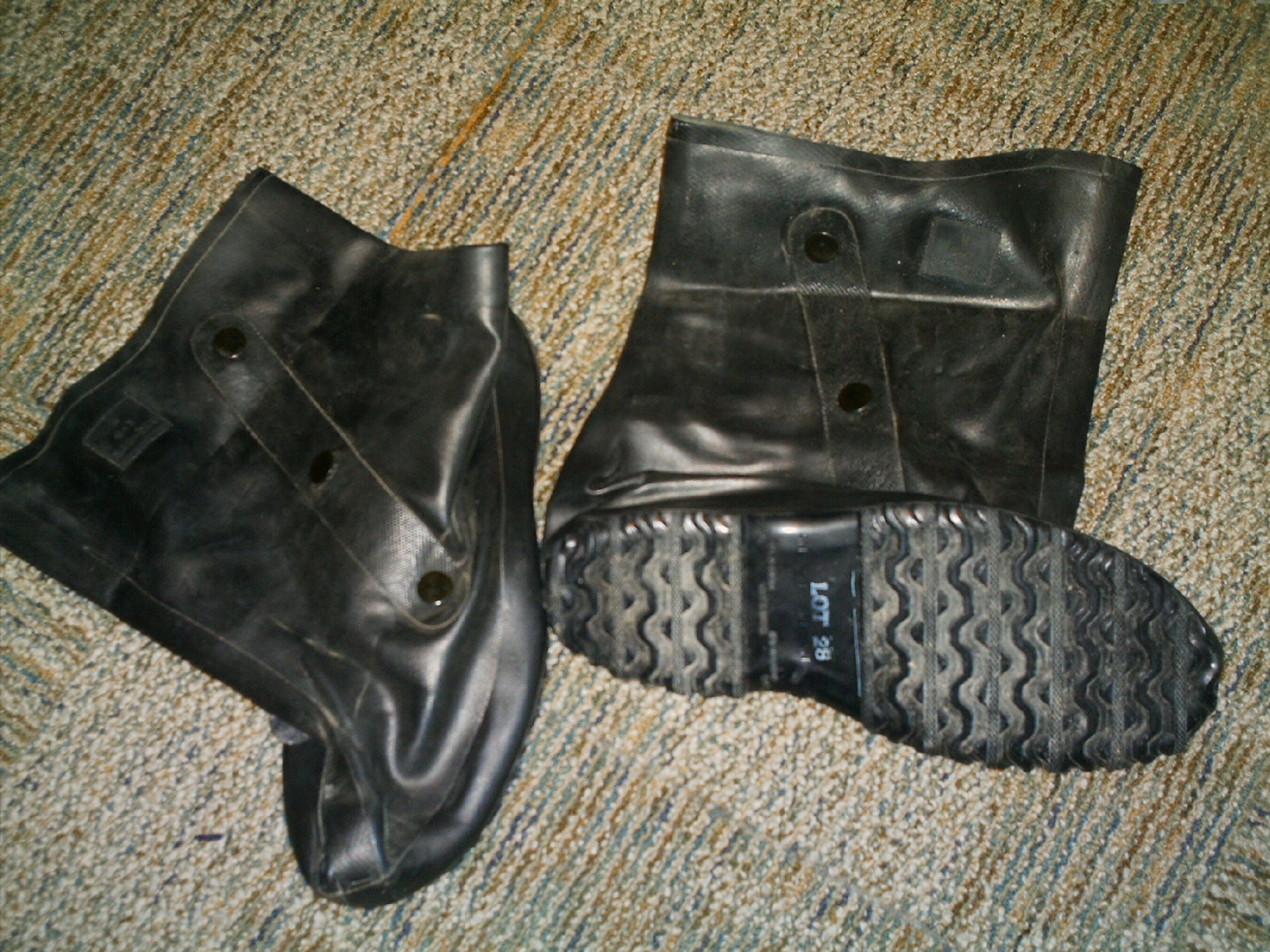
Overboots to be worn over combat boots

NBC stands for nuclear, biological, and chemical. It is a term used in the armed forces and in health and safety, mostly in the context of weapons of mass destruction (WMD) clean-up in overseas conflict or protection of emergency services during the response to terrorism, though there are civilian and common-use applications (such as recovery and clean up efforts after industrial accidents).

In military operations, NBC suits are intended to be quickly donned over a soldier’s uniform and can continuously protect the user for up to several days. Most are made of impermeable material such as rubber, but some incorporate a filter, allowing air, sweat and condensation to slowly pass through. An example of this is the Canadian military NBC suit.

The older Soviet suit was impermeable rubber-coated canvas. Now known as the CBRN suit, the British Armed Forces suit is reinforced nylon with charcoal impregnated felt. It is more comfortable because of the breathability but has a shorter useful life, and must be replaced often. The British Armed Forces suit is known as a "Noddy suit" because some of them had a pointed hood like the hat worn by the fictional character Noddy. The Soviet style suit will protect the wearer at higher concentrations than the British suit but is less comfortable due to the build-up of moisture within it. A Soviet suit was known as a "Womble" because of its long faced respirator with round visor glasses. In Canadian terminology, an NBC suit or any kind of similar protective over-suit is also known as a "Bunnysuit".

== See also ==
- CBRN defense – Protective measures against hazardous materials warfare (Chemical, Biological, Radiological, and Nuclear, known formerly as NBC)
- Fallout shelter – Space protecting occupants from radioactive debris
- Hazmat suit – Protective suit against chemical, bacteriological, and nuclear risks
- List of NBC warfare forces
- MOPP – Protective gear used by U.S. military personnel in a toxic environment (Mission Oriented Protective Posture gear)
- Personal protective equipment – Equipment designed to help protect an individual from hazards
- Positive pressure personnel suit – Air-tight industrial protection garment (PPPS) (for use in biocontainment)
- Respirator – Device worn to protect the user from inhaling contaminants
- Weapon of mass destruction – Weapon that can kill many people or cause great damage (WMD, formerly NBC weapon)
- Joint Service Lightweight Integrated Suit Technology - Used as part of MOPP.
