= Chemical Agent Detector Paper =

Paper used for detecting chemical agents

Chemical Agent Detector Paper is a type of paper used for detecting the presence of chemical agents, including nerve agents, mustard agents, and blister agents. The paper typically changes color in the presence of a chemical agent. The U.S. Military and first responders typically use the paper.

== M8 Detector Paper ==
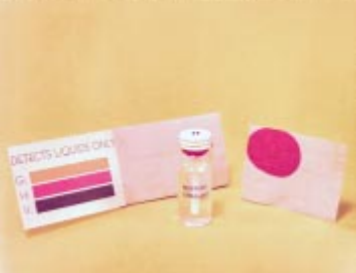
Starting from the left, the image includes the booklet of M8 testing paper (with accompanying testing legend), a testing vial, and a sample of used M8 Chemical Agent Detector Paper. The red stain on the M8 paper indicates it has been exposed to a H-Blister agent.

M8 Detector Paper is used to detect the presence of V and G type nerve agents and H type blister agents. It works by detecting chemical agents from a liquid splash. Each sheet of paper has three separate detection dyes. The yellow color appears when exposed to G nerve agents, the dark green color appears when exposed to V nerve agents, and the red color appears when exposed to H blister agents. The M8 detector paper does not detect agents in the form of aerosols or vapors.

The M8 was a Canadian invention, being first standardized in 1963. By 1964 it entered US service as part of the M15A2 Chemical Agent Detector Kit, with about 67,000 of these kits being produced from 1965-1969, with most other NATO nations also purchasing the M8.

== M9 Detector Tape ==
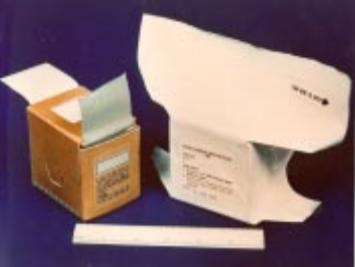
Image of a roll of M9 Chemical Agent Detector Paper and its packaging as produced in the early 1980s

M9 Detector Tape or paper is used to detect the presence of nerve (V- and G- types) and mustard (H, HD, HN, and HT) agents. It cannot identify what particular agent it is being exposed to. The tape is typically a dull cream color when not exposed to chemical agents, but will turn red in the presence of chemical agents. The tape is made from Mylar, which is the sticky backing, and a red agent detection dye. The detector tape does have false positives, which can be caused by antifreeze, petroleum-based products, and liquid insecticide.

The M9 was adopted by the US Army in 1980, although prior testing showed the dye used in the tape was mutagenic and possibly carcinogenic. Adoption nonetheless proceeded and the Army was able to find a replacement dye that was not mutagenic.

== Chemical Detection Kit ==
The M256/M256A1 Chemical Detection Kits include not only M8 Detector Paper for detecting the presence of toxins, but also enzyme-based "tickets" for identifying which agent is present. The M18 kit includes M8 sheets, "tickets", and test tubes loaded with colorimetric reagents for measuring the concentration of toxins.
