= 4th Artillery Regiment (Portugal) =

- Regimento de Artilharia N.º 4
- Active: 1917–present
- Country: Portugal
- Branch: Army
- Type: Field artillery
- Part of: Rapid Reaction Brigade
- Barracks: Leiria
- Mottos: Strong and Loyal (Fortes e Leais)
- Anniversaries: 29 June
- Engagements: World War I Portuguese Colonial War
- Decorations: Officer of Order of the Tower and Sword
- Website: Official Website

Commanders
- Present Commander: Col. Vítor Hugo Dias de Almeida
- First Commander (1927): Luís Veríssimo de Azevedo

Insignia
- Abbreviation: RA4

The 4th Artillery Regiment (Portuguese: Regimento de Artilharia N.º 4, RA4) OTE is a base unit of the Portuguese Army, stationed in Leiria. Presently, the RA4 is dependent on the Rapid Reaction Brigade, whose charges towards Operating System Component Forces.

== History ==
1917 - The current RA4 was created in Castelo Branco as the Field Howitzers Regiment or ROC (Regimento de Obuses de Campanha) through the integration of the old field howitzer battalions from 5th Artillery Regiment from Viana do Castelo and from the 6th Artillery Regiment from Porto.
1926 - The ROC was transferred to Leiria, being renamed 4th Artillery Regiment or RA4.
1927 - The unit was renamed 4th Light Artillery Regiment or RAL4 (Regimento de Artilharia Ligeira n.º 4).
1955 - The regiment received the task of organizing the divisional artillery headquarters and two of the three field artillery groups (battalions) of the 3rd Division of the Portuguese Expeditionary Corps, the Portuguese main land forces contribution to NATO.
1961 - With the beginning of the Portuguese Colonial War, the regiment organizes and sends, to Angola, three artillery companies (caçadores type), to act as infantry but composed of military gunners: the 101st, the 119th and the 178th artillery companies.
1963 - The RAL4, while retaining the same name, becomes a training center for military secretariat, especially for personal to be deployed to the Portuguese overseas territories in Africa.
1975 - The unit is renamed Artillery Regiment of Leiria or RAL (Regimento de Artilharia de Leiria). Since 1977, the RAL receives the task of organizing the Field Artillery Group (GAC) of the new 1st Independent Mixed Brigade. For that task it is equipped with 155 mm M109 self-propelled and with M101 towed 105 mm howitzers.
1993 - The unit is again renamed "4th Artillery Regiment" being responsible for the organization and maintenance of the Field Artillery Group of the Independent Airborne Brigade, equipped with M101 and later with M119 Light Gun howitzers.
2005 - As part of the reorganization of the Portuguese Army, the Rapid Reaction Brigade (ex-Airborne Brigade) ceased to have organic field artillery, and its Field Artillery Group is transferred to the Intervention Brigade (BrigInt). Following this reorganization, given the deactivation of the old BrigInt's artillery unit, the RA4's Field Artillery Group's became the sole towed field artillery operational unit of the Portuguese Army.
2009 - The 5th Artillery Regiment raised a new Field Artillery Group, which is attributed to the BrigInt. The RA4's Field Artillery Group is re-integrated in the Rapid Reaction Brigade.

== Equipment ==
Model	Image	Origin	Type	Notes
Infantry Weapons
Glock 17 Gen 5		Austria	Semi-automatic pistol	Service pistol.
FN SCAR L STD		Belgium	Assault rifle	Standard service rifle.
FN Minimi Mk3		Belgium	Light machine gun	Standard light machine gun.
Browning M2		United States	Heavy machine gun	Used on tripods and mounted on vehicles.
Carl Gustav M2		Sweden	Recoilless rifle	Modernised in 2020 by the UAGME.
FN40GL		Belgium	Under barrel grenade launcher	Purchased in 2019, used with the FN SCAR L or individually.
Artilley
Tampella B		Finland	120mm towed mortar	9 are operated by the Heavy Fire Battery of the Field Artillery Group.
L119 LG		United Kingdom	Towed howitzer	21 acquired between 1998 and 1999, succeeding to the M101A1 / M101A1L. 18 in service, it can be transported by the EH-101 helicopter.
Ordnance QF 25-pounder		United Kingdom	Ceremonial cannon / former field gun	3 units used for a ceremonial.
Command and Control
Raytheon AFATDS Advanced Field Artillery Tactical Data System	–	United States	Automated command and control system	Automated command-and-control software for coordinating, planning, and executing fire support.
Elbit Systems Coral-CR		Israel	Binocular with laser rangefinder	Used by artillery and mortar advanced observation units for ISTAR (Intelligence, surveillance, target acquisition and reconnaissance) missions.
Tactical Vehicles
HMMWV M1025A2		United States	4×4 armoured vehicle	Known in the army as the Auto Blindado Reconhecimento 1.25 ton, and this variant is the mf/00.
Mitsubishi L200		Japan	4×4 utility vehicle	Army designation: TG4 Mitsubishi 4x4 L200 MF/08.
Land Rover Defender		United Kingdom	4×4 command vehicle	Army designation: Land Rover Defender 90 TD SW E 4×4 MF/08.
Toyota Land Cruiser HZJ73		Japan Portugal (licence)	4×4 utility vehicle	Assembly in the Portuguese Toyota factory, Salvador Caetano. Army designation: Toyota Land Cruiser D 4×4 MF/01.
Iveco 40.10 WM		Italy Portugal (local modification)	4×4 light tactical truck	Army designation: mA/89-90.
Iveco 90.17 WM		Italy	4×4 tactical truck	Army designation: mA/91.
Mercedes-Benz Unimog 1100		Germany	4×4 tactical truck	Variants with or without winch. Used to tow L119 LG howitzers.
Unimog 1750L		Germany	4×4 tactical truck	Variants with or without winch.
RMMV TGS 26.440 BB CH		Germany	4×4 tactical truck	Purchase in 2023 as part of a batch of 61 trucks, 13 of which have a modular armoured cab for general transport.
MAN 10.224		Germany	4×4 tactical truck	Army Designation: Auto TG 4 ton. TP20.
DAF YA 4440D		Netherlands Portugal (partial assembly)	4×4 tactical truck	Army designation: Auto TG 5 ton DAF YA 4440D.

== Awards and decorations ==
- 2 Decorations of Officer of the Military Order of the Tower and Sword of Valour, Loyalty and Merit
- 3 1st Class Honours War Cross
- Gold Distinguished Service Medal
- Gold Medal of the City

== Gallery ==
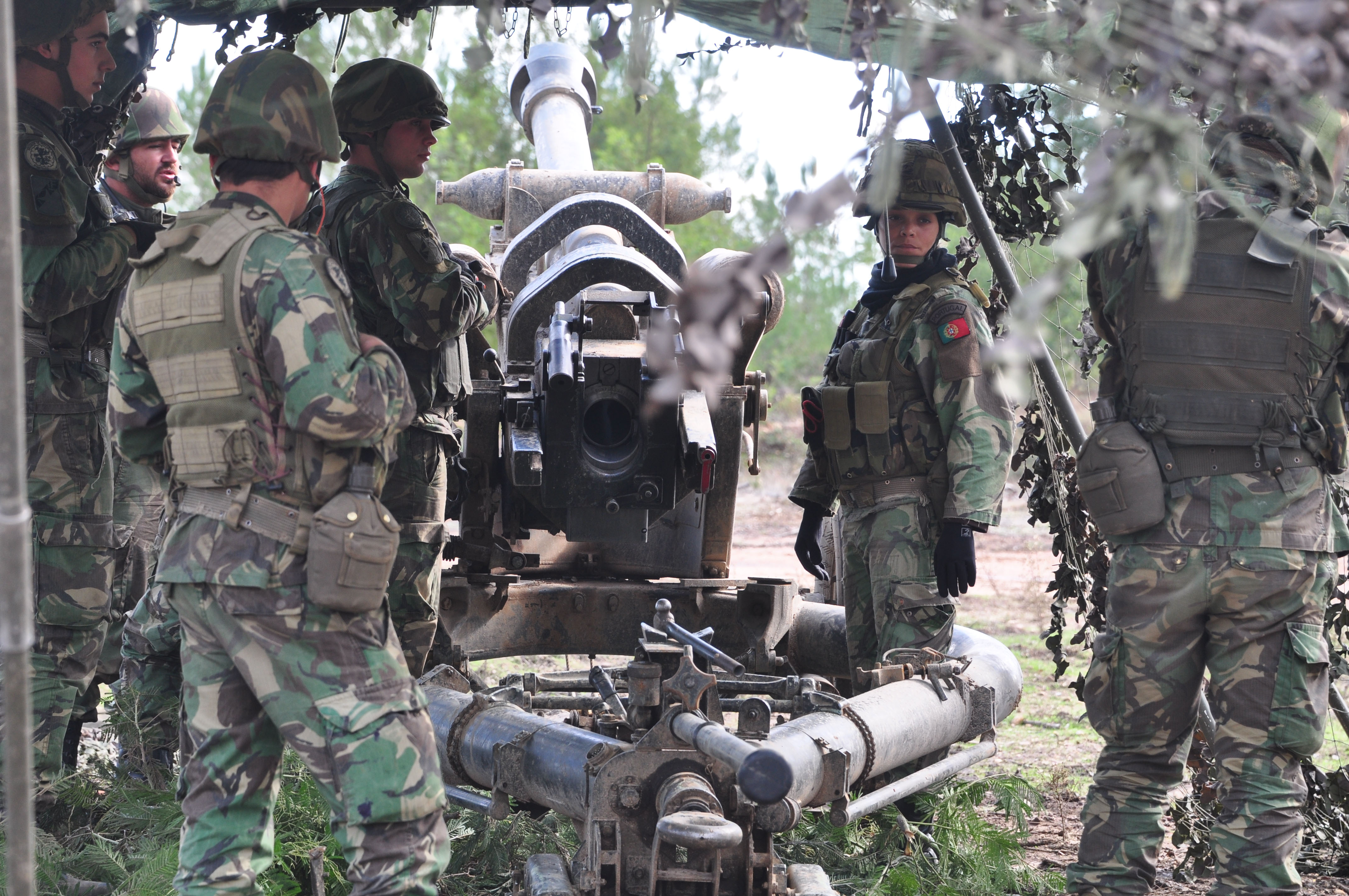
Firing Range of the Portuguese Field Artillery

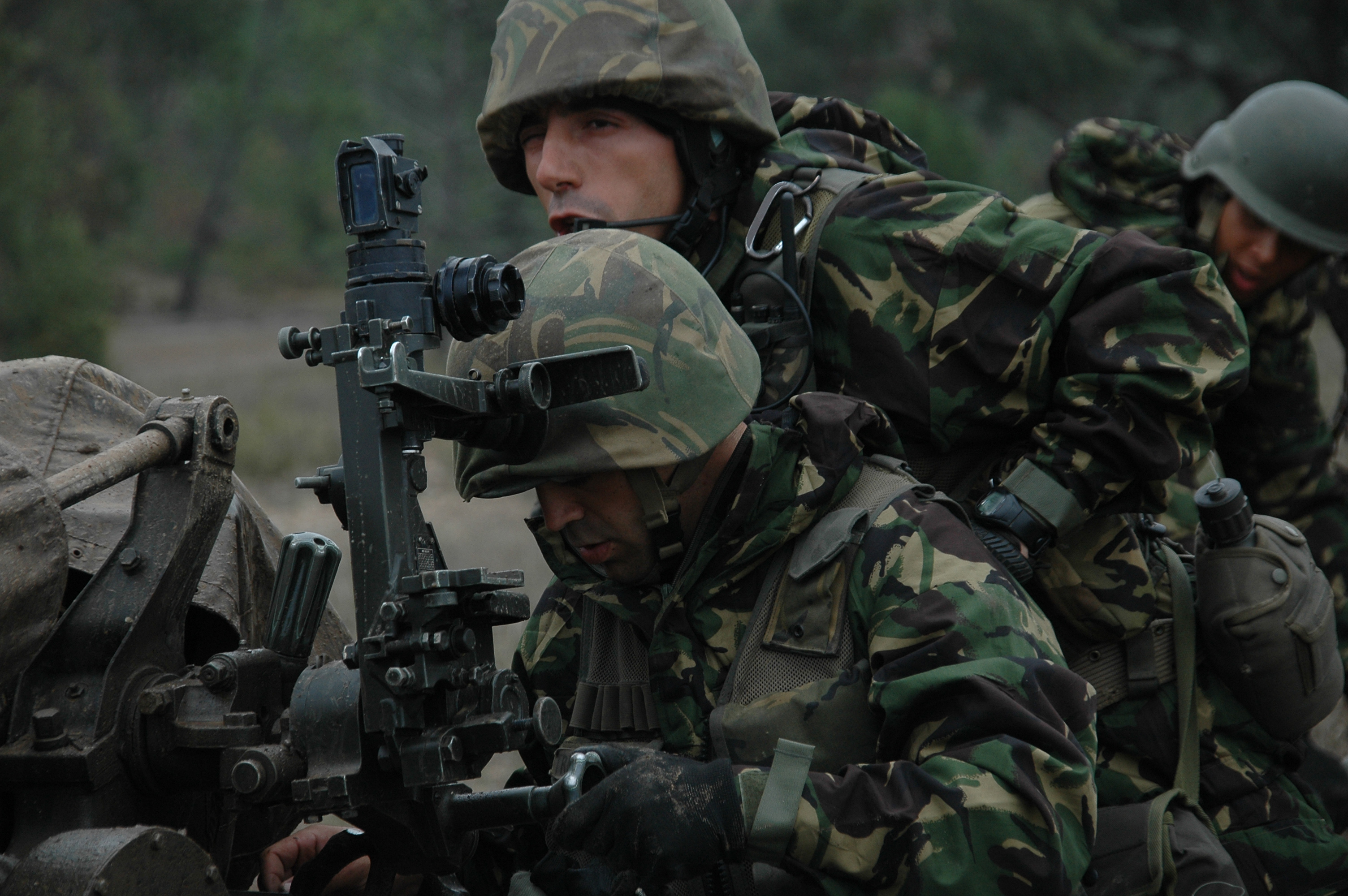
Portuguese Army Artillery Forces

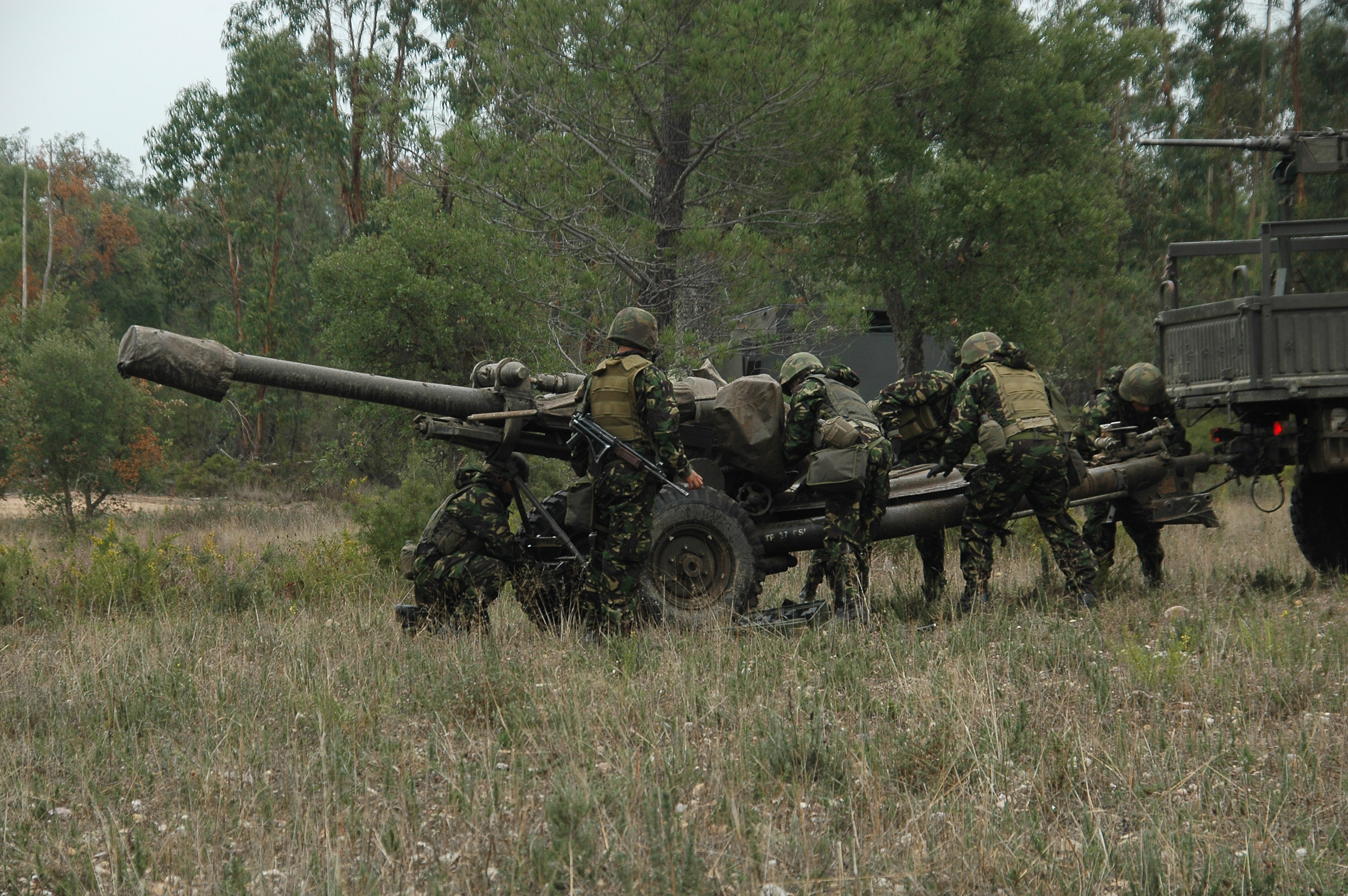
Portuguese Army Artillery Forces during Trident Juncture 15

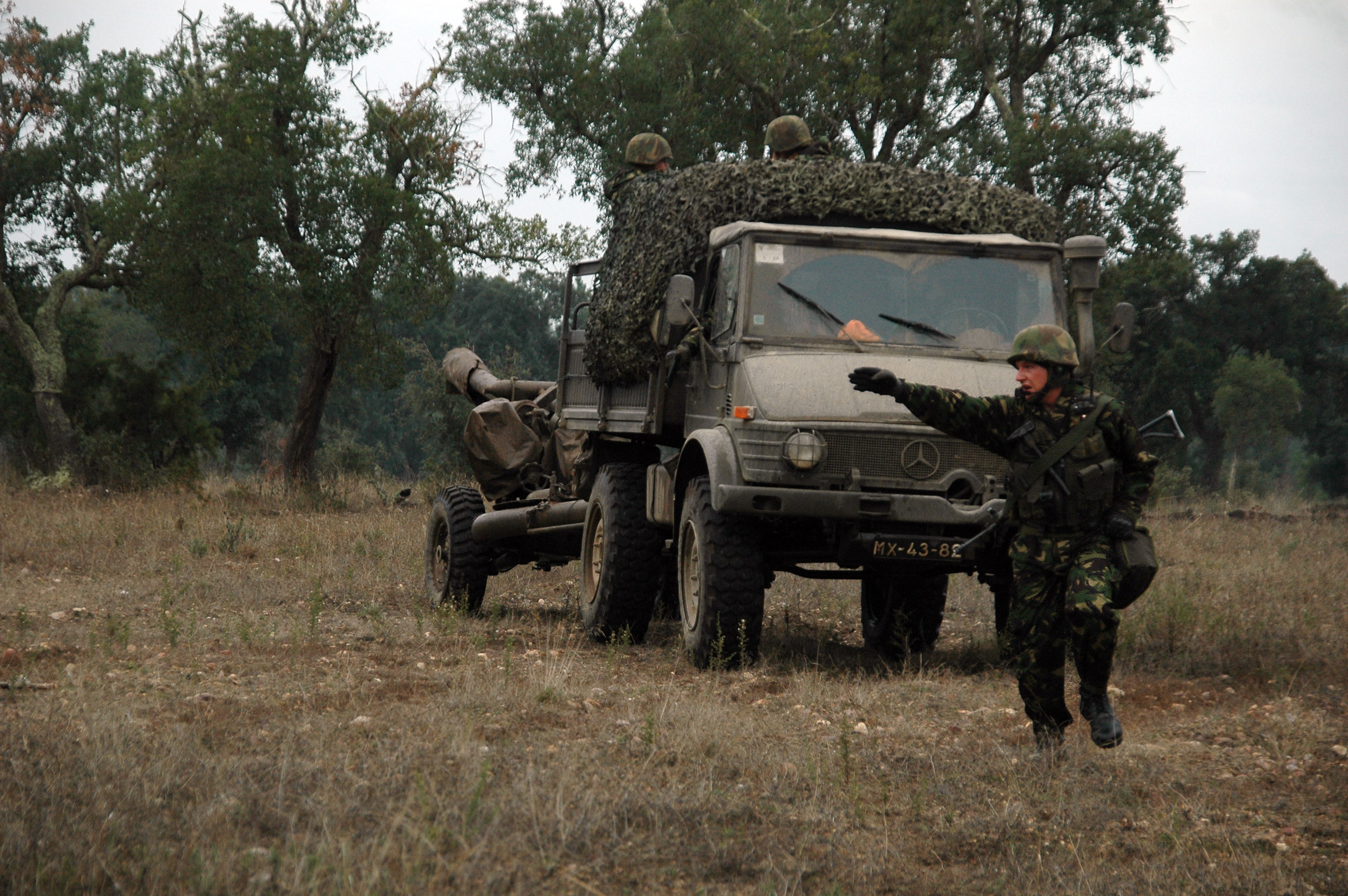
Portuguese Army Unimog towing a L118 light gun.

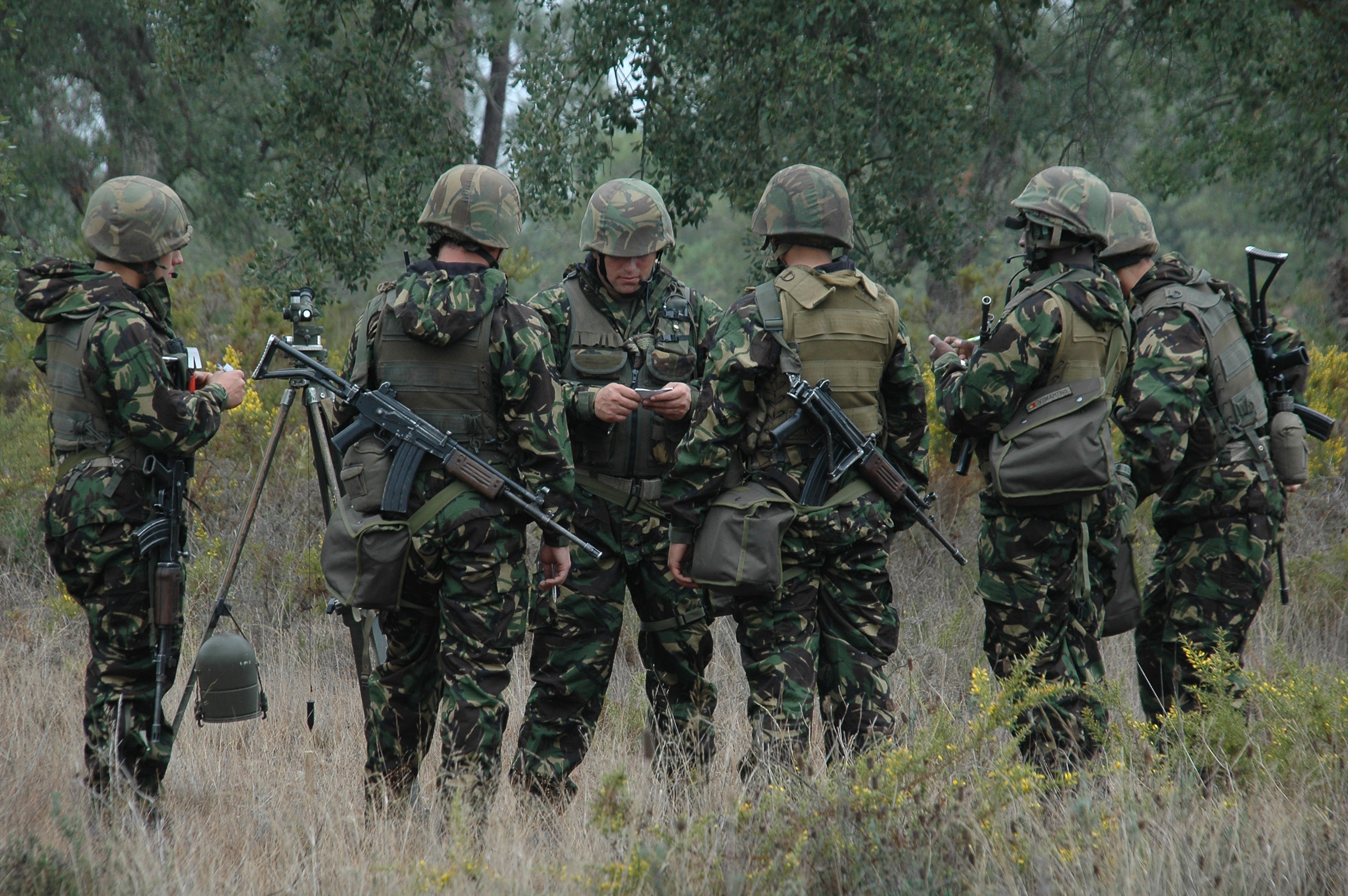
Portuguese 4th Artillery Regiment soldiers

== Sources ==
Regimento de Artilharia n.º 4 - translated http://www.exercito.pt/SITES/RA4/Paginas/default.aspx - translated https://web.archive.org/web/20150924020310/http://www.g-sat.net/showthread.php?444233-Historia-Regimento-de-Artilharia-n%C2%BA-4-(Leiria) - translated
