= M106 mortar carrier =

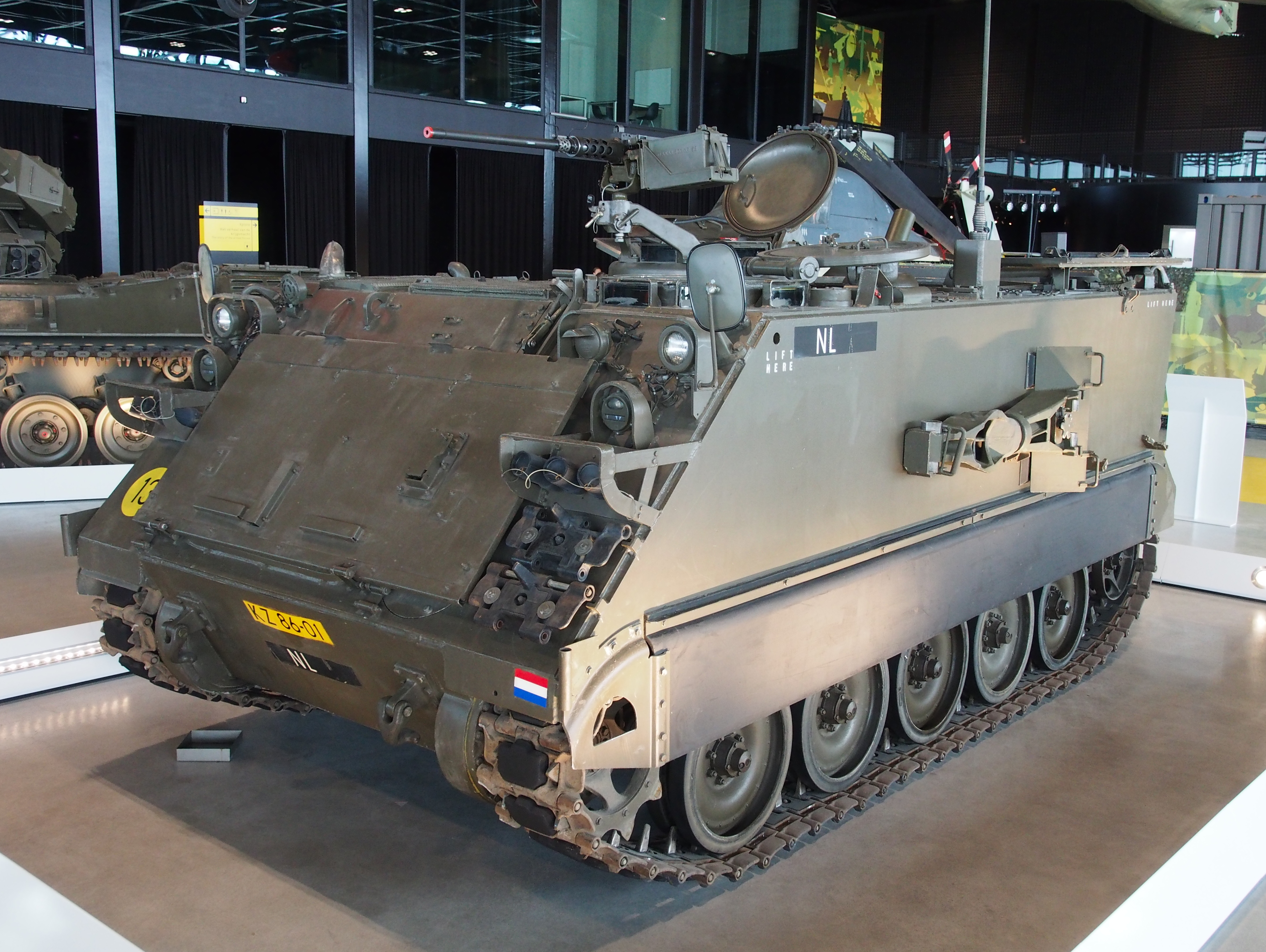
- Type: Mortar carrier
- Place of origin: United States

Service history
- Used by: see operators
- Wars: Cambodian Civil War; Vietnam War; Sino-Vietnamese War; Lebanese Civil War; Russo-Ukrainian war

Production history
- Manufacturer: FMC Corp.
- Variants: XM106, M106, M106A1, M106A2

Specifications
- Mass: 12.9 short tons (11.7 t)
- Length: 16.2 feet (4.9 m)
- Width: 9 feet (2.7 m)
- Height: 7.3 feet (2.2 m)
- Crew: 6
- Armor: 5083 Aluminum
- Main armament: M30 4.2 in (106.7 mm) mortar
- Secondary armament: M2 Browning
- Engine: Detroit Diesel 6V53T; 210 horsepower (160 kW)
- Payload capacity: 88 rounds (HE, Illumination, White Phosphorus)
- Transmission: Allison X200-4 series
- Ground clearance: 16.5 inches (42 cm)
- Fuel capacity: 90 US gallons (340 L)
- Operational range: 250 nautical miles (460 km)

The M106 mortar carrier (full designation: Carrier, Mortar, 107 mm, Self-propelled) was a tracked, self-propelled mortar carrier in service with the United States Army. It was designed to provide indirect fire support to primarily infantry, units, but could also provide support to any unit under attack within range. It was replaced with the M1064 mortar carrier.

== History ==
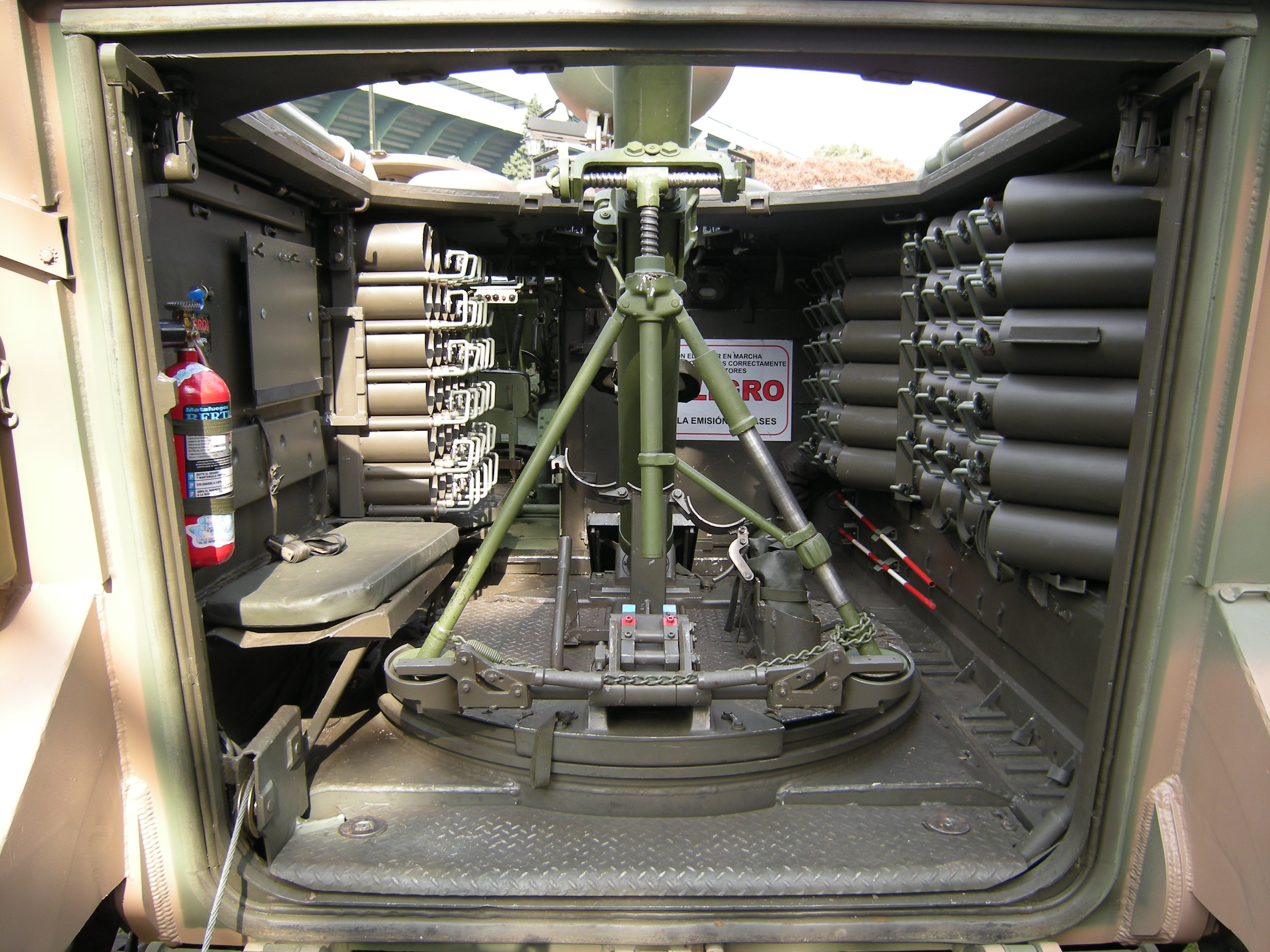
Interior view of mortar, hatch and stowage

The M106 is a variation of the M113 armored personnel carrier that carried a 107 mm M30 mortar. It was introduced in 1964, alongside the similar M125 81 mm mortar carrier, and deployed in Vietnam. Three variants existed: the M106, the M106A1 and the M106A2. 862 M106 (including 841 for US forces), 1,409 M106A1 (including 990 for US forces) and 350 M106A2 (including 53 for the US forces) were produced.

After intensive trials in 1988, the US Army chose to replace it with the 120 mm Soltam K6. Some of the M106 carriers were upgraded to the M1064A3 configuration by replacing the 107 mm mortar by a 120 mm mortar.

== Operators ==
- Argentina: 25 M106A2
- Egypt: 65 M106A1 and 35 M106A2
- Greece
- Peru: 24 M106A1
- Libya
- Morocco: 32-36 M106A2
- Norway: 24
- Portugal: In service currently: 16 (1 M106 and 15 M106A2). Originally 18 (3 M106 and 15 M106A2) purchased from the USA in 1997. 2 M106 retired from service in January 2020 (demilitarised and scrapped).
- Taiwan: 90 M106A2
- Ukraine: 10 M106A2
- Vietnam: Captured during the Vietnam War. Refurbished to be equipped with the domestic 100mm mortar SC100TX.

=== Former operators ===
- Khmer Republic (Cambodia): 17 M106A1 with a 107 mm mortar.
- South Vietnam
- Switzerland: M106 with a 120 mm mortar, known as 12 cm Mw Pz 64 (Minenwerferpanzer 64) and 12 cm Mw Pz 64/91. 132 bought, retired from service in 2009.
- United States
- Italy: M106 with a Mortier 120 mm Rayé Tracté Modèle F1

== See also ==
- M1064 mortar carrier
- Variants of the M113 armored personnel carrier
- List of U.S. military vehicles by model number

== Bibliography ==
- Kenneth Conboy, Kenneth Bowra, and Mike Chappell, The War in Cambodia 1970–75, Men-at-arms series 209, Osprey Publishing Ltd, London 1989. ISBN 0-85045-851-X
- Sak Sutsakhan, The Khmer Republic at War and the Final Collapse, U.S. Army Center of Military History, Washington D.C. 1980. – available online at Part 1Part 2Part 3 Part 4.
- Simon Dunstam, Terry Hadler and David E. Smith, The M113 series, Vanguard series 34, Osprey Publishing Ltd, London 1983. ISBN 0-85045-495-6
