= Soltam M-65 =

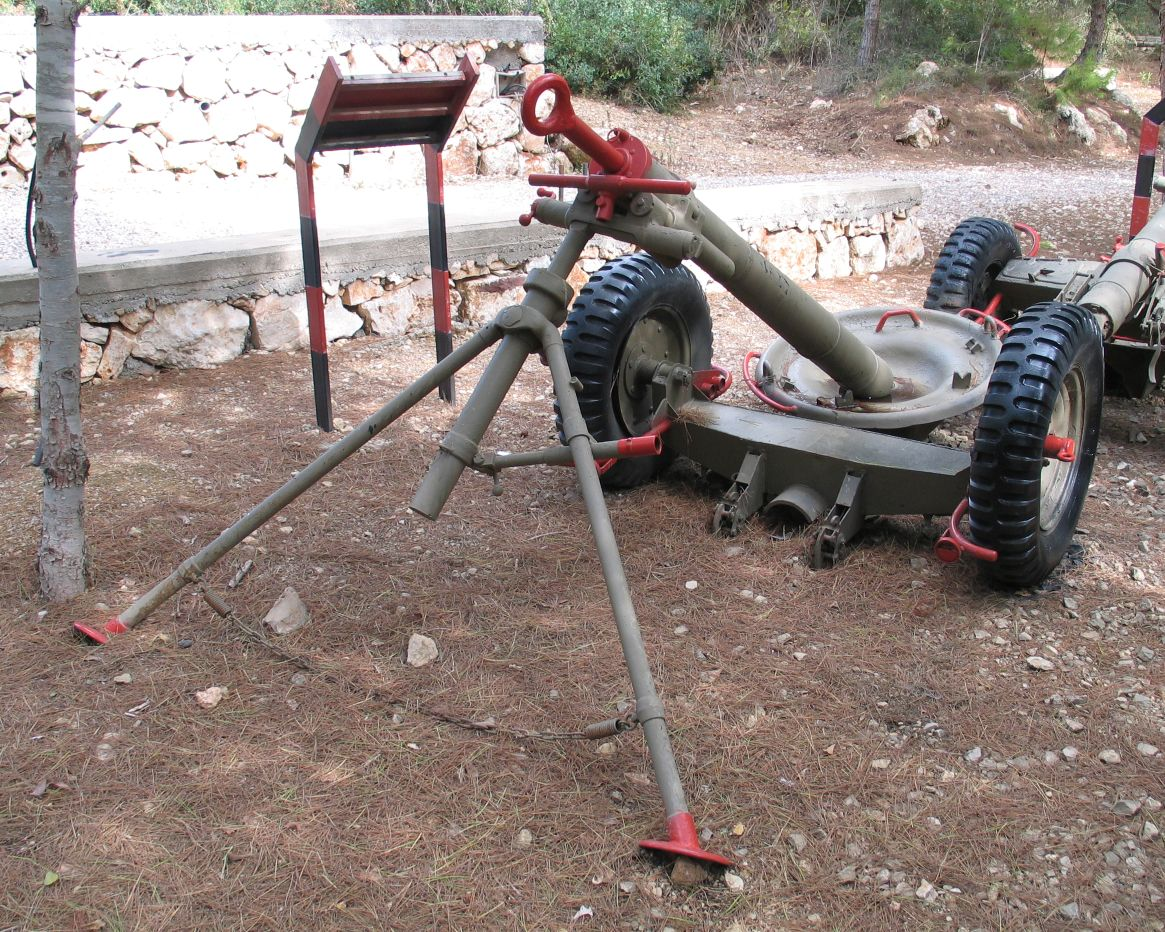
- M-65 Standard
- Type: Mortar
- Place of origin: Israel

Service history
- Used by: See Operators
- Wars: Six-Day War; Yom Kippur War; Lebanese Civil War; 1978 South Lebanon conflict Nicaraguan Revolution; 1982 Lebanon War; South Lebanon conflict (1985–2000); South African Border War; Internal conflict in Myanmar

Production history
- Designer: Tampella
- Designed: 1953
- Manufacturer: Soltam Systems

Specifications
- Mass: 231 kg (firing position), 351 kg (travelling)
- Crew: 6
- Shell: Standard 120mm NATO mortar round
- Caliber: 120 mm
- Carriage: M151 Jeep style carriage wheels
- Elevation: +30°/+80°
- Traverse: -20°/+20°
- Rate of fire: 1st minute: 16 rounds burst, 4 rounds per minute sustained thereafter.
- Maximum firing range: 6500m

The Soltam M-65 is a 120 mm mortar that was developed by Tampella in 1953 via introduction of new baseplate for 120 Krh/40 invented by Hans Otto Donner. In 1960s Soltam Systems of Israel bought a license. The mortar system comes in two versions, a standard mortar and a long-range version.

== Design ==
This heavy mortar is light enough to be transported by helicopter sling load, drop by parachute or carried in an APC such as the M113 Armored Personnel Carrier. It can also be towed as a normal artillery piece or even manhandled if necessary. The wheels on the carriage are the same as fitted to the M151 Jeep, and have handling rings to aid in manhandling it. All components are made of chrome-plated or stainless steel to resist wear and corrosion.

=== Vehicle mounted version ===
- M3 Mk. D - a M3 Half-track based 120 mm mortar carrier (used exclusively by Israel Defense Forces until replaced by the M1064 mortar carrier),

== Operators ==
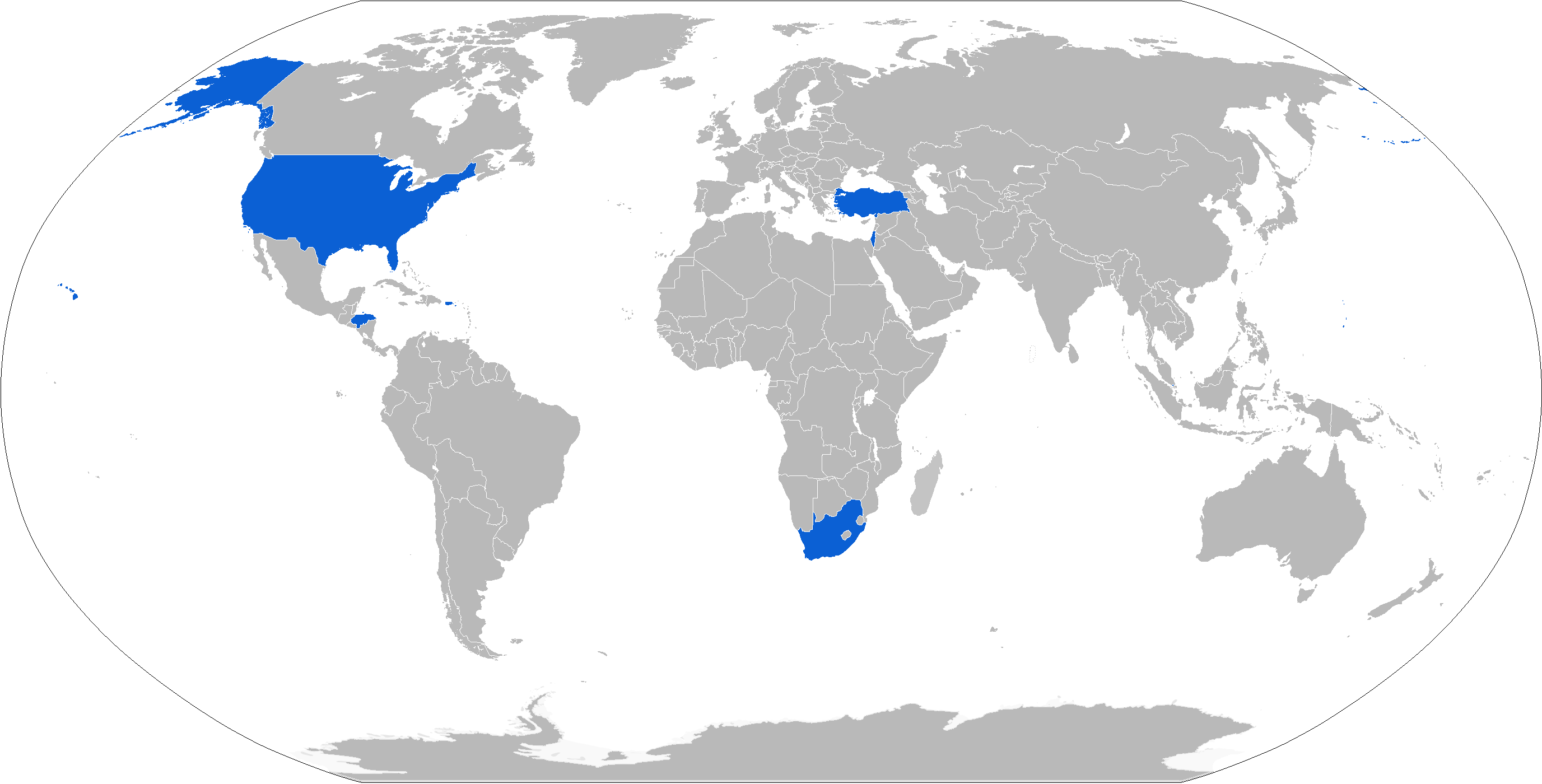
Map with M-65 operators in blue

=== Current operators ===
- Honduras: Honduran Army
- Israel: Israel Defense Forces (primary user)
- Myanmar: Myanmar Army
- Nicaragua
- Singapore: Singapore Army
- South Africa: South African Army
- Turkey: Turkish Land Forces 179 units
- United States: United States Army

=== Former operators ===
- Lebanese Forces
- South Lebanon Army
- Nicaragua: National Guard of Nicaragua

== See also ==
- Mortier 120mm Rayé Tracté Modèle F1
- Soltam K6 (US Army designation M120)
- Soltam M-66
- List of weapons of the Lebanese Civil War
