= Army Light Aviation Unit (Portugal) =

- Unidade de Aviação Ligeira do Exército
- Active: June 1, 2000 — July 2015
- Country: Portugal
- Branch: Army
- Type: Army aviation
- Role: Tactical Air Transport, Reconnaissance, Close Air Support
- Part of: Rapid Reaction Brigade
- Garrison/HQ: Tancos Military Air Field

The Army Light Aviation Unit (Portuguese: Unidade de Aviação Ligeira do Exército, UALE) was an aviation unit of the Portuguese Army. Created in 2000 as the Army Light Aviation Group (GALE), it is the Army's unit dedicated to missions of light aviation, being integrated in the Army Forces System, under the operational command of the Ground Forces Operational Command (Portuguese: Comando Operacional das Forças Terrestres). It was planned to be equipped with light fire support and medium maneuver helicopters.

== History ==
=== Background ===
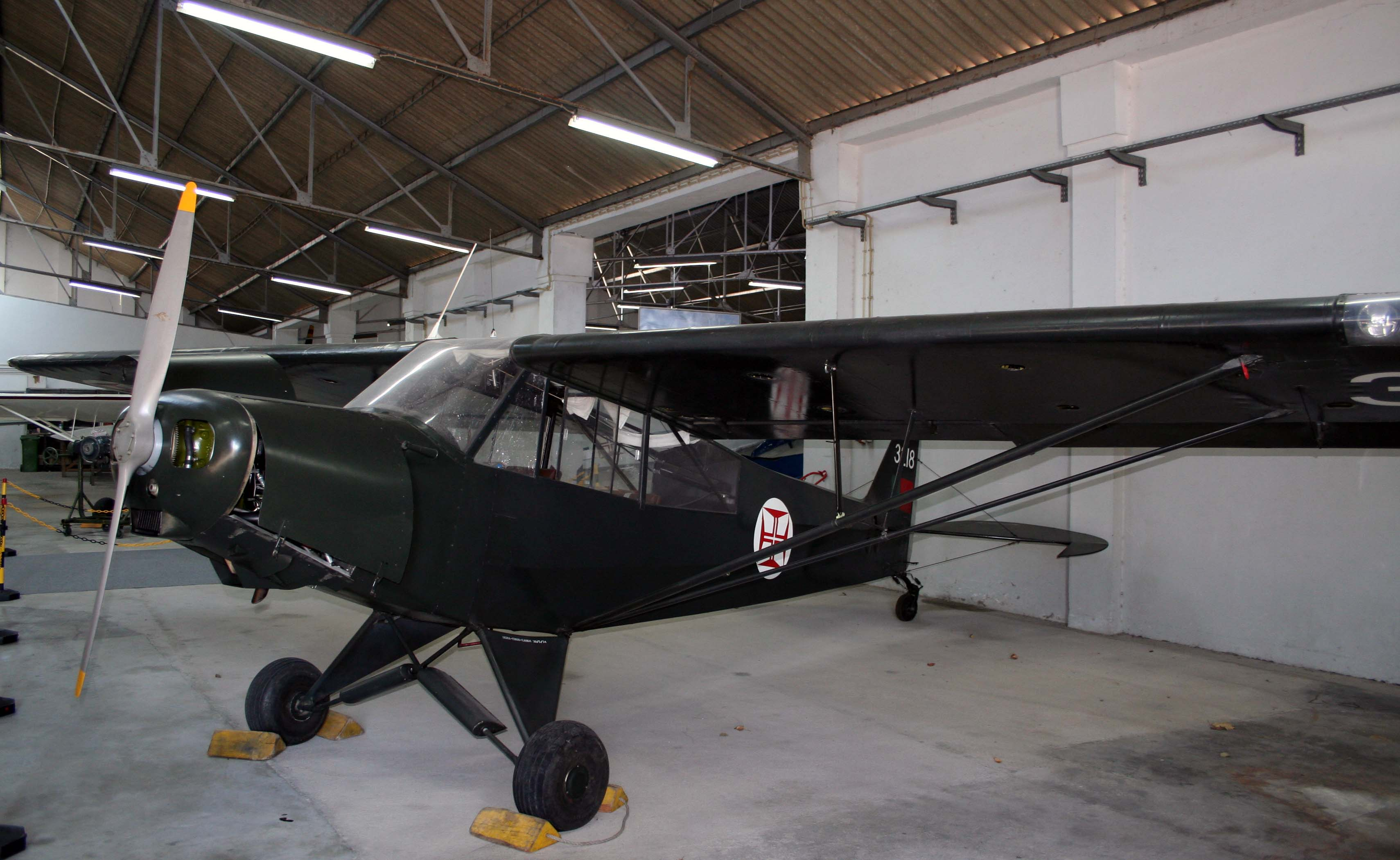
Old Piper Super-Cub L-21 of the Artillery Observation Light Aviation of the Portuguese Army in the 1950s, now in the Air Museum.

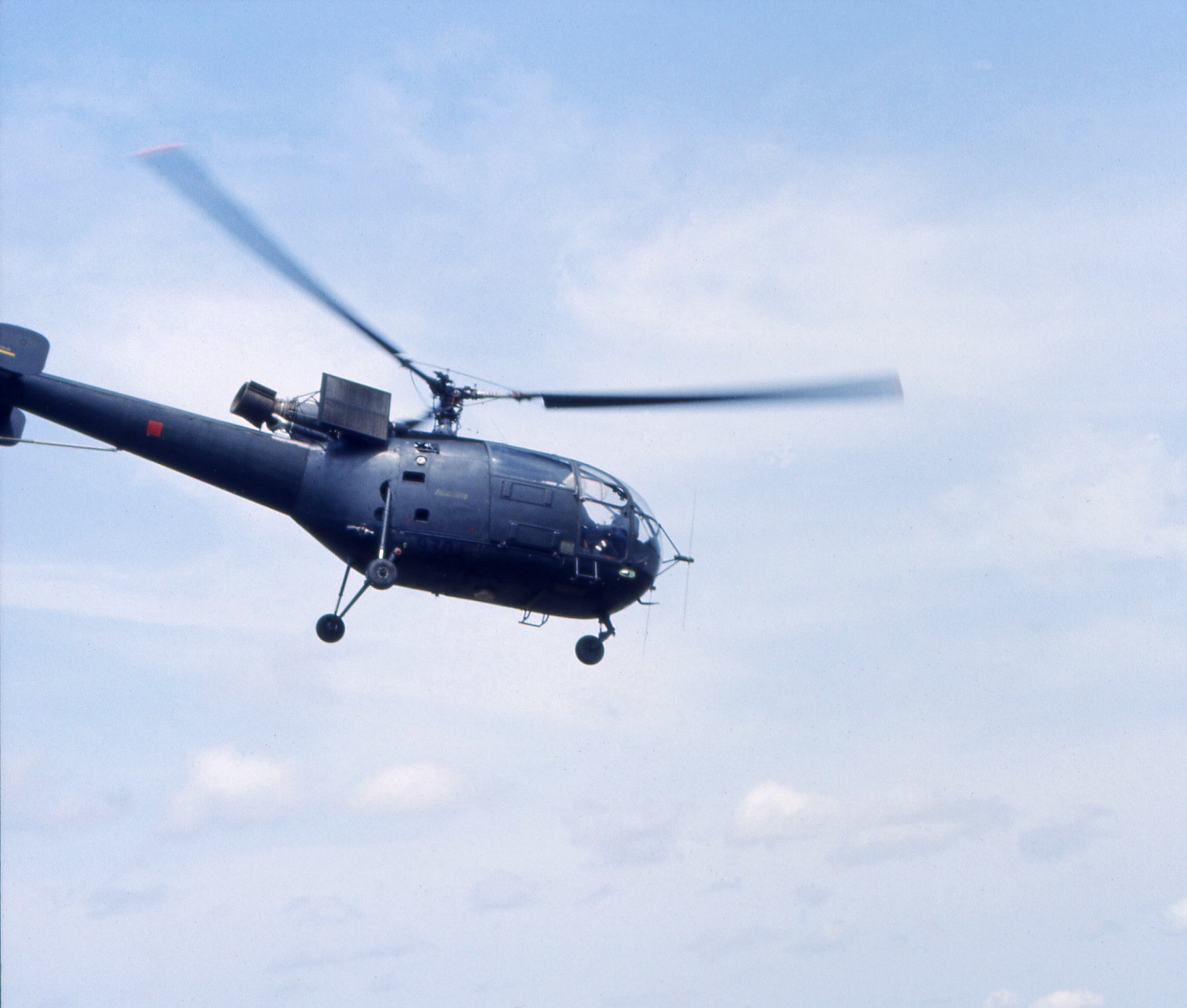
A Portuguese Air Force Alouette III performing a medical evacuation during the war in Portuguese Guinea.

The Portuguese Army maintained its own aviation arm from 1914 to 1952. This arm received a high degree of autonomy in 1937, including its own separate chain of command, although continuing to be administratively connected to the Army. In the early 1950s, the decision was taken to completely separate it from the Army, becoming an entirely independent branch of the Armed Forces. The decision was also taken to separate the Portuguese Naval Aviation from the Navy and to put it under the control of the new independent air branch. The new branch created in 1952, became the Portuguese Air Force, unifying all the Portuguese military aviation assets and operations under a single command.

At the same time that the process of the separation of the Portuguese Air Force was being carried away, the Army felt the need to continue to maintain its own light aviation service to support the artillery arm in the observation and direction of fire over targets located beyond the horizon. This need led the Army minister General Abranches Pinto to boost the process of activation of what was intended to be the future Artillery Observation Light Aviation. The process advances in 1952, with the sending of officers for training in the US Army Artillery Aviation, with the construction of the General Abrantes Pinto Air Field in the artillery range area of the Army Artillery School at Vendas Novas and with the reception of 22 Piper Super-Cub L-21 observation and liaison planes. Eight of these aircraft started to be permanently based at the Army Artillery School Air Field, being used in the artillery observation role and piloted by artillery arm pilots-observers. The remaining aircraft were only used in maneuvers, being piloted by Air Force pilots. Meanwhile, the concept of Army light aviation evolved and plans were being made to equip it in the future also with helicopters and to give it other missions besides those related with the artillery. The process of the raising of the Army Light Aviation is however terminated in 1955, with the transference of the Piper Super-Cub aircraft to the Air Force, these forming an Army cooperation Liaison and Training Flight based at the Tancos Air Base.

During the Portuguese Overseas War (1961–1974), all military air assets were part of the Air Force. These were employed both in independent operations and in cooperation with the land and naval forces, under the coordination of the joint military commands. The Air Force was equipped with assets oriented for the counter-insurgency, including new helicopters that were used to perform joint helicopter operations involving Commandos and Paratroopers (these then being part of the Air Force). Occasionally, the Air Force established detachments of cooperation that operated under the command of Army units.

=== Creation of the Army Light Aviation Unit ===
In the 1980s, based on the experience gained in Africa and the increasingly importance of the helicopter in NATO military operations, a work group was created by the Army's Cavalry Arm Directorate to study and plan the creation of a light aviation unit. On July 12, 1991, the National Defense Superior Council decided to add a light aviation unit to the Medium Term Forces System (Portuguese: Sistema de Forças de Médio Prazo). On June 30, 1993, the Ministry of National Defense approved the addition of the Army Light Aviation Group (Portuguese: Grupo de Aviação Ligeira do Exército, GALE) to the list of units to be created, and on August 31 the financing of the program.

A commission to prepare for the creation of the unit was then created in 1997. On June 1, 2000, the Army Light Aviation Group was officially formed.

On July 1, 2006, the Army Light Aviation Group (GALE) was re-designated as Army Light Aviation Unit (Portuguese: Unidade de Aviação Ligeira do Exército, UALE), as part of the Army's Base Structure and of the Rapid Reaction Brigade.

During its existence, the UALE was responsible to serve as the administrative parent unit of the Communications Company of the Rapid Reaction Brigade' and to operate and maintain the Tancos airfield. Due to the lack of aircraft, it however never performed air activities, which were supposedly the reason for its existence.

The unit was disbanded in the scope of the new Army organization established in July 2015.

== Aircraft procurement ==
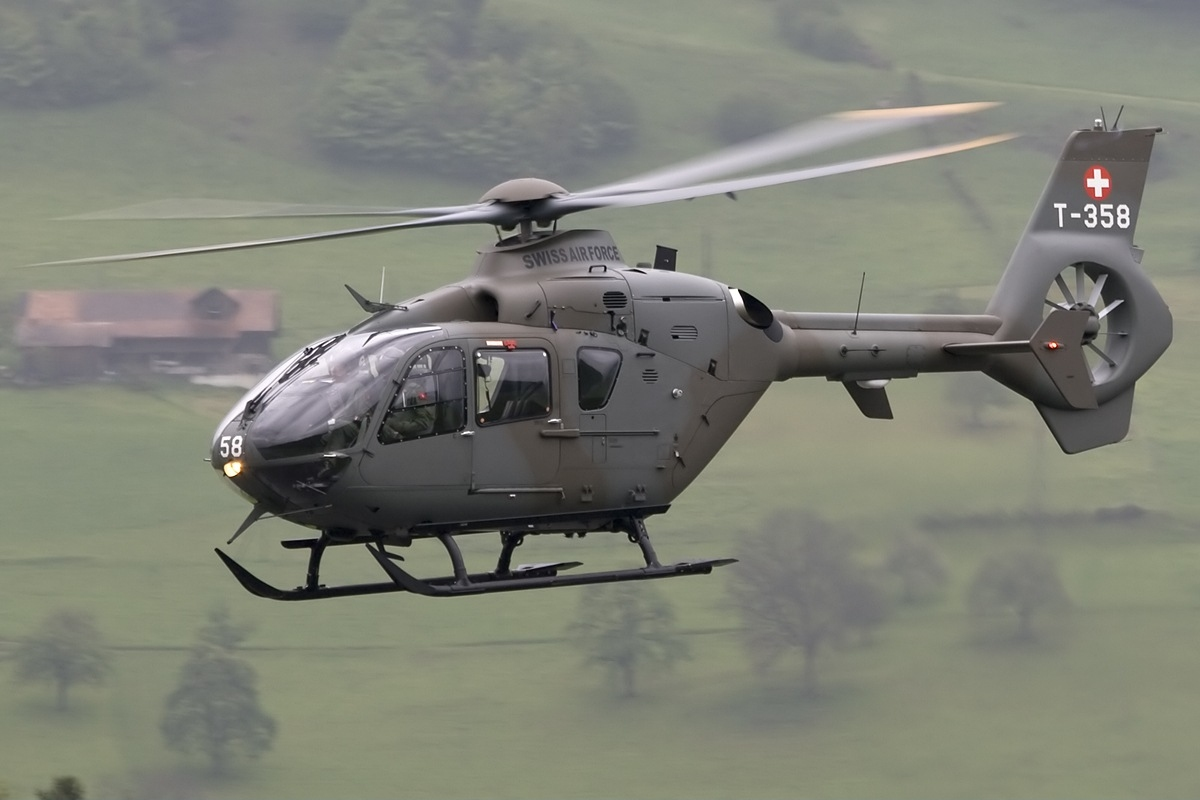
A Swiss EC635 P2, a helicopter initially developed to address the specific requirements of the Portuguese Army, but that ended up not being used by it.

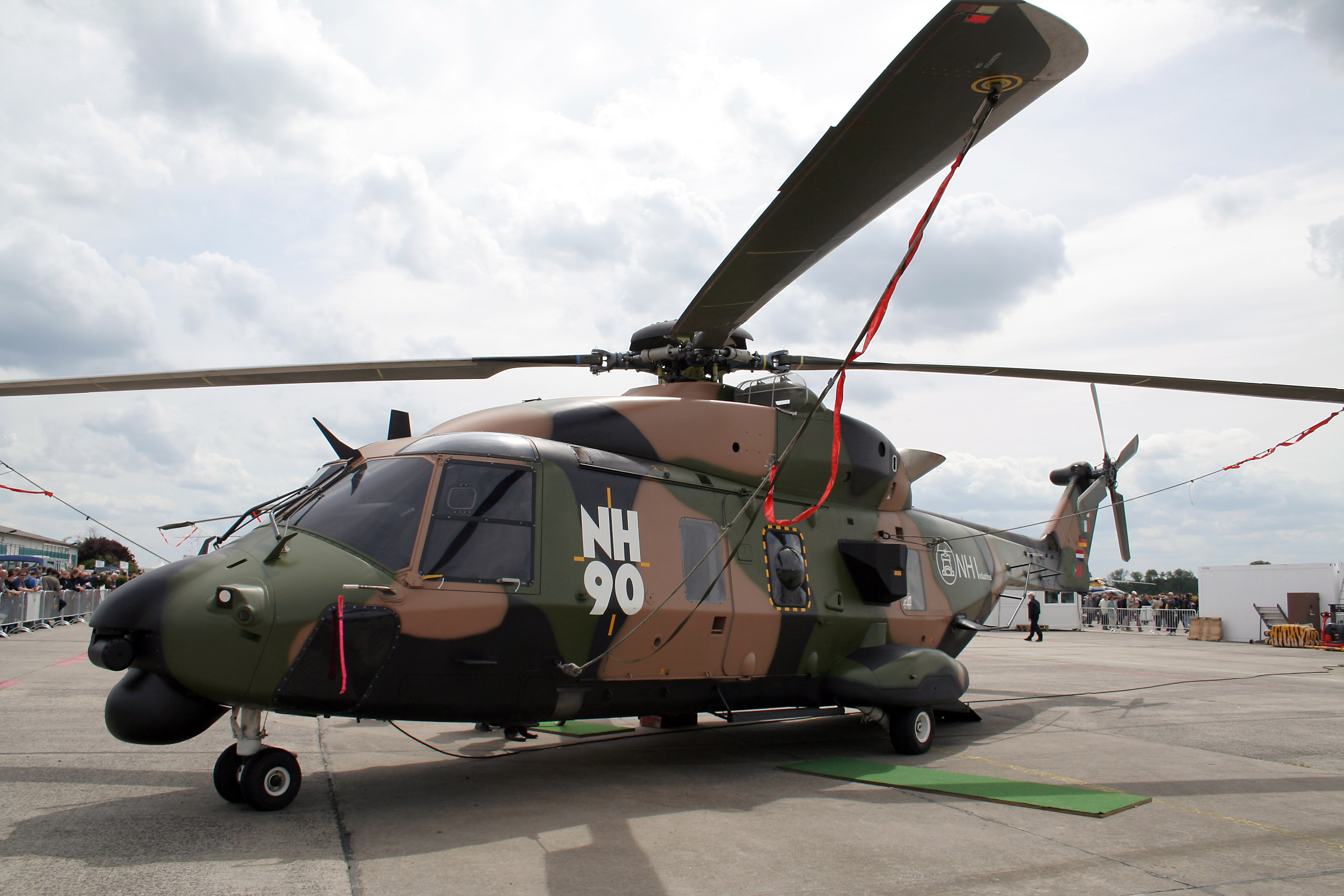
NH90 TTH mock-up with Portugal's flag representing the Portuguese participation in the program.

The unit was originally intended to be equipped with nine light utility helicopters and with ten medium transport helicopters.

In 1999, the Eurocopter EC635 T1 was acquired for the light utility, anti-tank and reconnaissance role. The EC635 had been specifically developed by Eurocopter precisely to meet the Portuguese Army requirements for its light aviation unit. However, the EC635 program was cancelled in 2002 with the lack of a certification to fire HOT 2 anti-tank missiles and the delivery of the helicopters being cited as the official reason.

In June 2001, the NHIndustries NH90 TTH was selected for the medium transport role.

In 2004, the Portuguese government prepared to open a new competition for the acquisition of light helicopters for both the UALE and the Portuguese Air Force, to replace the Alouette III, but the competition was eventually cancelled.

In June 2012, the Portuguese government officially announced that it would cancel the order of all ten NHI NH90 due to budget cuts, thus compromising the future of the UALE.

== Operational history ==
The pilots and ground crews of the UALE underwent training with the Portuguese Air Force, with pilots undergoing flight training in the PoAF's Alouette III helicopters. The Army's pilot have also received training on the Eurocopter EC135 in the Spanish Army Airmobile Force.

Between 2007 and 2012, under an agreement with EMA — Empresa de Meios Aéreos, S. A., a company owned by the Portuguese government, Army pilots flew EMA's Kamov Ka-32 helicopters in fire-fighting and other public interest missions for the Portuguese Ministry of Internal Administration.

== See also ==
- Army aviation
- Portuguese Air Force
- NHIndustries
