= 15th Infantry Regiment (Portugal) =

- Regimento de Infantaria N.º 15
- The GOLD stands for nobility and constancy, SILVER for wealth and eloquence, RED for the warlike ardor and strength, BLUE for care and loyalty and GREEN for hope and freedom.
- Active: 1641/1762–present
- Country: Portugal
- Branch: Army
- Type: Infantry; Airborne Infantry (1st Parachute Battalion)
- Part of: Rapid Reaction Brigade
- Garrison/HQ: Tomar
- Mottos: Strong and Constant (Firmes e Constantes)
- Engagements: Napoleonic Wars Peninsular War: Battle of Buçaco; Battle of Redinha; Battle of Foz de Arouce; Battle of Sabugal; Battle of Fuentes de Oñoro; Blockade of Almeida; Siege of Ciudad Rodrigo; Siege of Badajoz; Battle of Salamanca; Siege of Burgos; Battle of Vitoria; Siege of San Sebastián; Battle of Nivelle; Battle of the Nive; Battle of Bayonne; Liberal Wars; World War I: Western Front; Battle of the Lys; Hundred Days Offensive; Portuguese Colonial War; East Timor; KFOR; Bosnia and Herzegovina ISAF; MINUSCA
- Website: RI15 Official Website; RI15 and 1ºBIPara Website

Commanders
- Present Commander: Victor Sérgio Antunes Gomes
- First Commander: António de Figueiredo e Vasconcelos
- Notable commanders: Luís do Rego Barreto

Insignia
- Regiment Abbreviation: RI15
- Paratroopers Abbreviation: 1ºBIPara

The 15th Infantry Regiment (Portuguese: Regimento de Infantaria N.º 15, RI15) is a unit of the Base Structure of the Army, stationed in Tomar, currently with the operating charge of organizing, training and maintaining the 1st Parachute Battalion (1BIPara) Rapid Reaction Brigade.

The RI15 is one of the oldest military units from Portugal and is the most decorated of the Portuguese Army.

== History ==
The RI15 was created in 1762 under the name 2nd Infantry Regiment of Olivença, from the split into two units, from the Regiment of Olivença, created in 1641 as Terço of Olivença. In 1806, the 2nd Infantry Regiment of Olivença was renamed to 15th Infantry Regiment. Since its inception, the regiment participated in all the campaigns of the Portuguese Army. After being installed in several locations, in 1901 the unit moved its headquarters to Tomar.

== Chronology ==
1641 - Creation of the Terço of Olivença / Regiment of Olivença.
1762 - Creation of the 2nd Infantry Regiment of Olivença from the split of the Terço of Olivença / Regiment of Olivença.
1806 - The 2nd Infantry Regiment of Olivença as the 15th Infantry Regiment.
1807 - The Napoleonic troops occupy Portugal. Part of the Portuguese Army is incorporated in the Portuguese Legion to be sent to France, and one of its battalions formed by troops from RI15. The legionary battalion participated in the Russian campaign, fighting at Wagram, Smolensk, Moscow and Borodino.
1808–1814 - The regiment is reorganized in Vila Viçosa participating in the Peninsular War campaigns integrated into the Anglo-Portuguese Army commanded by Marshal Beresford first and later by Marshal Wellington. Under command of Colonel Baker, the regiment distinguishes itself in the battles of Badajoz, Victoria and San Sebastian.
1817 - The RI15 deploys one of its battalions to Brazil where it takes part in the liberal movement of the Rio de Janeiro.
1824–1833 - The RI15 takes part in the civil war between liberals and absolutists, on the side of the liberal cause.
1834–1901 - The regiment suffered several reorganizations and transfers of their barracks being located successively in Estremoz, Lagos and Faro to settle in Tomar, where he still remains today;
1917–1918 - During the World War I, a battalion of the RI15 is integrated in the Portuguese Expeditionary Force sent to France, where it fights on the western front. The battalion distinguished themselves at the Battle of La Lys, receiving the honour to form to the right of all other units in military formation.
1926–1939 - The RI15 moved headquarters again to Lagos, returning to Tomar in 1939.
1941–1944 - During the World War II the RI15 deploys an expeditionary battalion to Portuguese Cape Verde;
1961–1975 - The RI15 becomes one of the largest units mobilizing troops fighting in the Portuguese Colonial War. Their expeditionary battalions and companies suffer a total of 637 killed in action.
1977 - The RI15 becomes responsible for the organization and training of the 1st Motorized Infantry Battalion of the 1st Independent Mixed Brigade;
1977–1993 - The RI15 renamed as Infantry Regiment of Tomar (RIT), returning to the previous name in 1993.
1998 - The RI15 shall depend on the Airborne Troops Command, with operational responsibility to organize, train and retain the 1st Airborne Infantry Battalion (1st Airborne Battalion);
2000 - The RI15 becomes responsible for the Battalion of Support Services of the Independent Airborne Brigade;
2001 - The 1st Airborne Battalion was renamed as 1st Parachute Infantry Battalion (1ºBIPara).
2006 - The RI15 becomes a unit of the Base Structure of the Army dependent of the Rapid Reaction Brigade, maintaining the same operating responsibilities.

== Equipment ==
=== Infantry equipment ===
Pistol

- Glock 17 Gen 5

Submachine gun

- Heckler & Koch MP5

Assault/Battle rifle

- FN SCAR L STD
- FN SCAR H STD

Machine gun

- FN Minimi Mk3
- FN MAG (limited use)
- Browning M2HB

Mortar

- FBP Morteirete 60mm mortar
- L16A2 81mm mortar

Grenade launcher

- Heckler & Koch GMG
- Mk 19

Anti-tank weapon

- Carl Gustav M3
- MILAN

Air-defence system

- FIM-92 Stinger

=== Tactical vehicles ===
- URO VAMTAC ST5
- Mitsubishi L200 4x4
- Land Rover Defender'90 TDI 4x4

=== Transport vehicles ===
- Iveco 40.10 WM
- Iveco 90.17 WM
- DAF YA 4440 D
- Unimog 1750L

=== Transport aircraft ===
- Embraer C-390 Millennium (Portuguese Air Force)
- Lockheed C-130 Hercules (Portuguese Air Force)
- EADS CASA C-295 (Portuguese Air Force)

== Awards and decorations ==
- Commandery of the Military Order of the Tower and Sword of Valor, Loyalty and Merit, Portugal - 1919
- Medal of Military Valour Gold, Portugal - 1919
- Croce di Guerra al Merit, Italy - 1921
- Croix de Guerre avec Palme 1914–1918, France - 1958
- Fourragère de la Médaille militaire, France - 1958
- Order of Military Merit, Brazil - 1966
- Medal for Distinguished Service Gold, Portugal - 1985
- Gold Medal for Distinguished Service to Palma, Portugal - 1987
- Honorary Member of the Military Order of Aviz, Portugal - 2002
- Gold Medal of the City of Tomar, Portugal - 2002
- Honorary Member of the Military Order of Christ, Portugal - 2006

== Sources ==
- "Regimento de Infantaria nº 15". exercito.pt. Archived from the original on 2014-07-28.
