= Soltam K6 =

Soltam K6 mortar
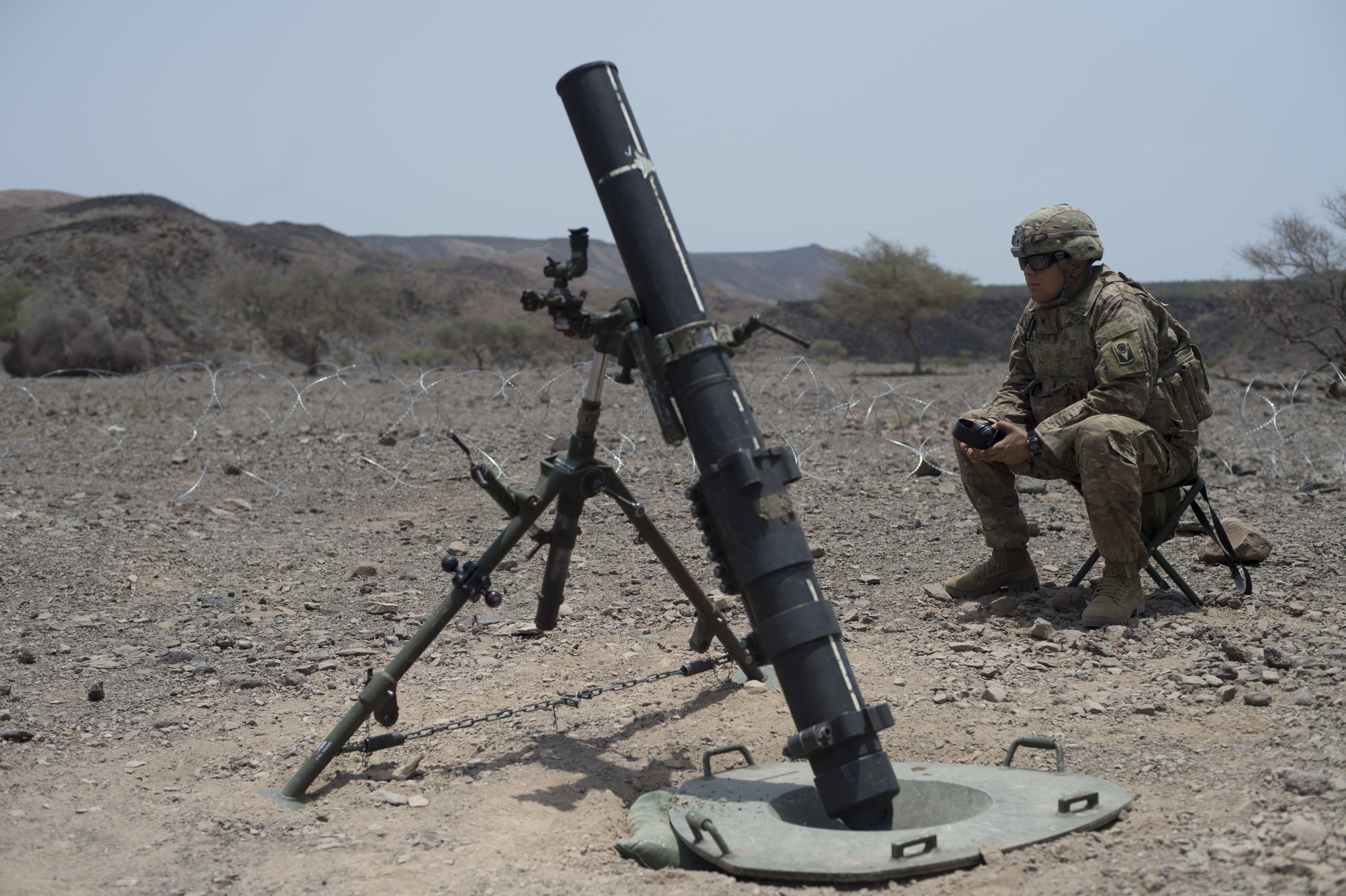
- Type: Mortar
- Place of origin: Israel

Service history
- Used by: See below

Specifications
- Mass: 144.7 kg (319 lb)
- Crew: 5
- Caliber: 120 millimetres (4.7 in)
- Rate of fire: 16 RPM max, 4 RPM sustained
- Effective firing range: 7,240 metres (7,920 yd)
- Feed system: manual

The Soltam K6 is a 120 mm (4.75 inch) mortar that was developed by Soltam Systems of Israel. It is the long-range version of the Soltam K5 and has replaced older systems, such as the 107-millimetre (4.2 in) M30, in several armies, including the United States Army. It is much lighter than the M30, has a greater range, and can sustain a rate of fire of four rounds per minute, while the M30 could sustain only three.

== Design overview ==
The K6 fires fin-stabilized ammunition from a smoothbore barrel. Unlike its smaller-ammunition cousins, the 81 mm and 60 mm mortars, the fin blades of the ammunition fired from the M120 are not canted. Thus, no spin is imparted to the projectile in flight. Although heavy mortars require trucks or tracked mortar carriers to move them, they are still much lighter than field artillery pieces. They outrange light and medium mortars, and their explosive power is much greater. An improved version is known as the K6A3.

High-explosive rounds fired by the M120 weigh about 31 lb (14 kg) and can have a lethality radius of 225 ft (69 m).

== History and deployment ==
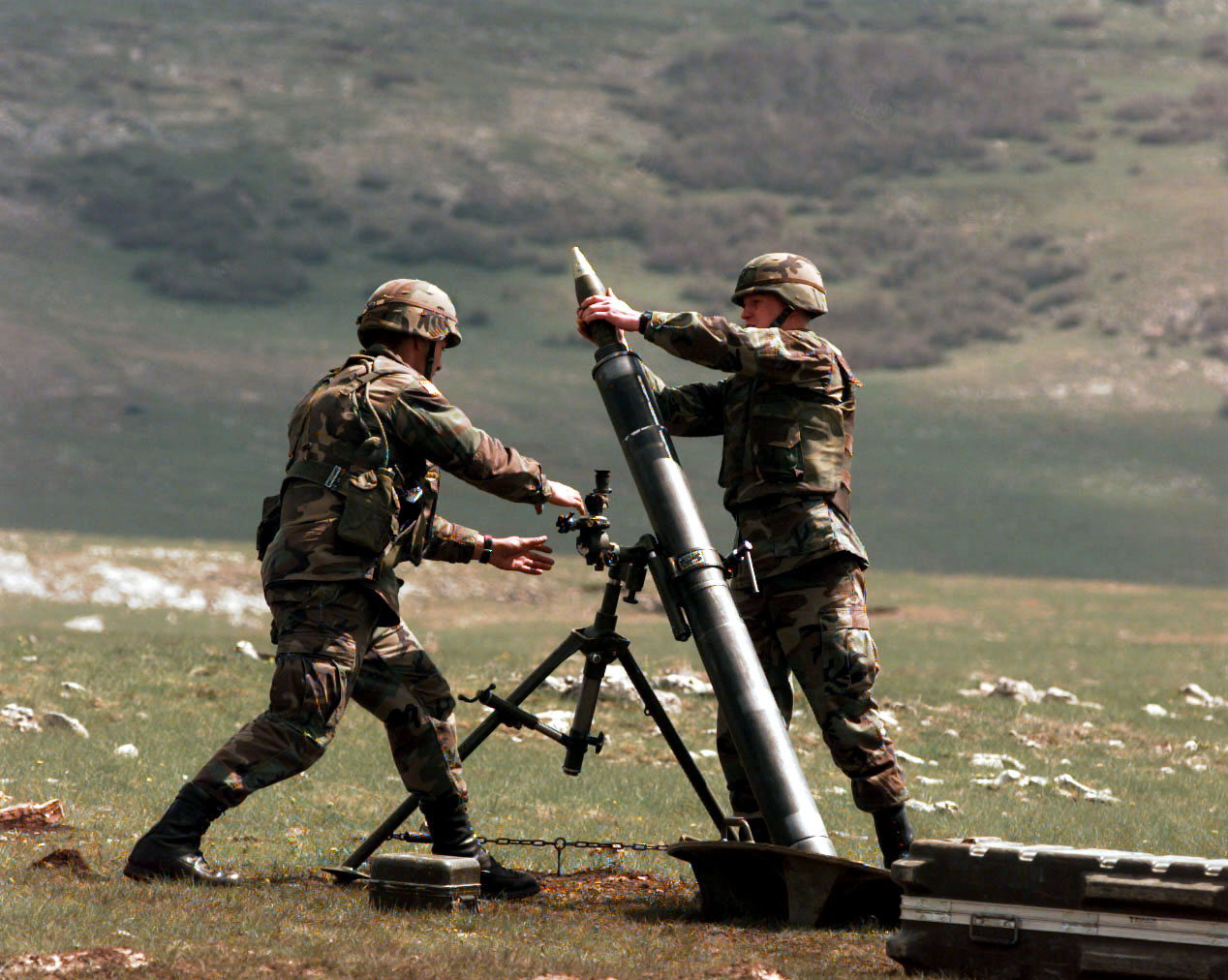

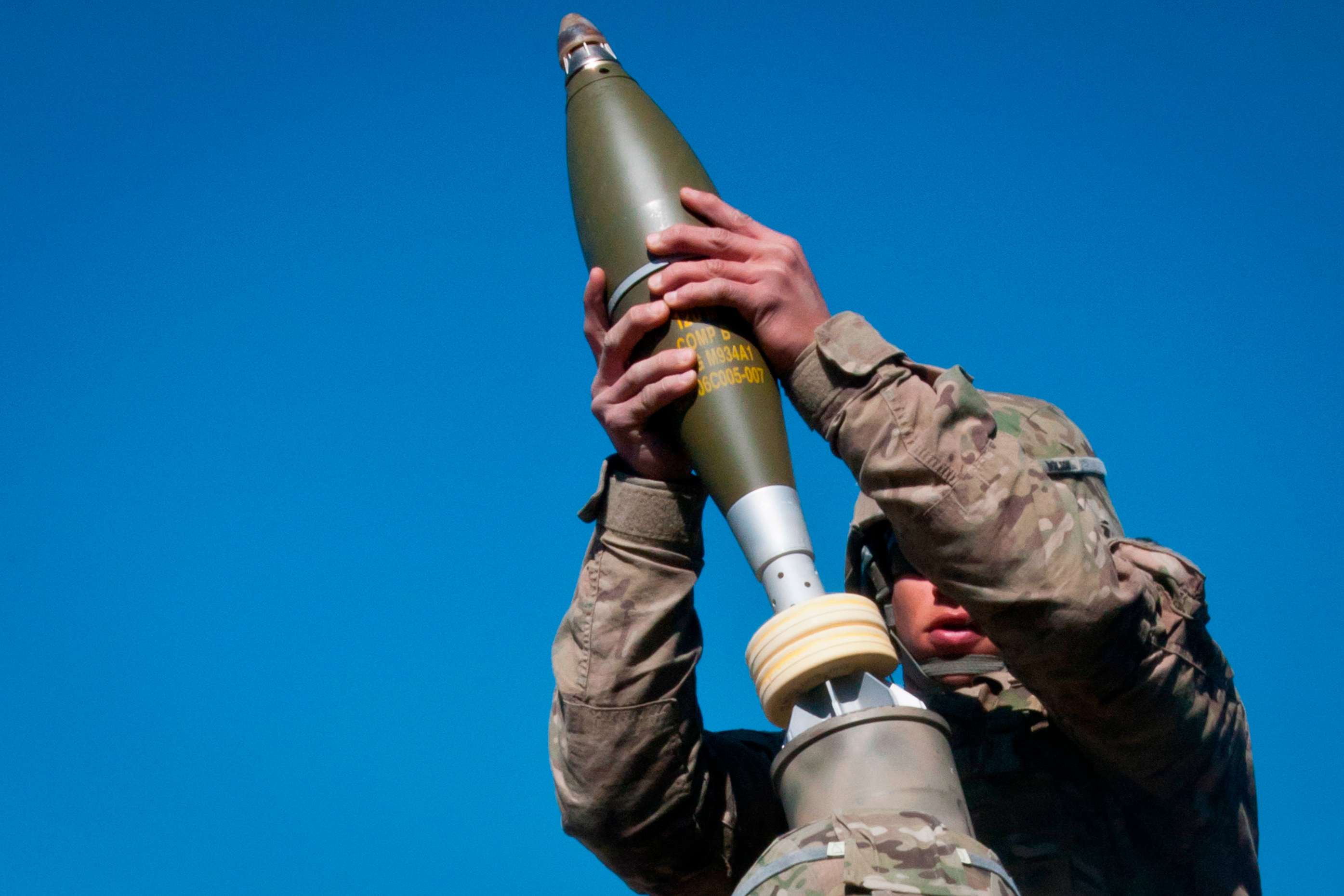
M934A1 high-explosive round with propellant rings

The K6 entered service with the United States Army in 1991 as the M120 Mortar System. Its mission is to provide heavy-weapon, high-angle organic indirect fire support to the unit commander. The M120 is used by both mechanized units and light infantry in certain situations. Another feature of the M120 is the M303 sub-caliber insert, which allows the mortar to fire 81 mm ammunition.

The M120 is transported on the M1100 trailer by the M998 Humvee. The version that is mounted on the M1064 and M1129 mortar carriers is known as the M121.

In 2007, the U.S. Army ordered 588 M326 MSS (mortar stowage systems) from BAE Systems. Here, the assembled mortar is mounted on a truck, Humvee or M1101 trailer and can be mounted and dismounted in less than 20 seconds.

In November 2016, Elbit Systems announced it was awarded an Indefinite Delivery/Indefinite Quantity (ID/IQ) contract for the production of the M121

== Components ==
The M120 mortar system consists of the following major components:

- M298 cannon assembly – 50 kg (110 lb)
- M190 bipod assembly – 32 kg (71 lb)
- M9 baseplate – 62 kg (137 lb)
- M1100 trailer – 181 kg (399 lb)
- M67 sight unit – 1.1 kg (2.4 lb)

The M120 is capable of firing the following munitions:

- XM395 precision guided munition
- M929 smoke cartridge (White Phosphorus)
- XM930 illumination round
  - XM930E1 illumination round
- XM931 practice round
- M933 high-explosive round
  - M933A1 high-explosive round
- M934 high-explosive round
  - M934A1 high-explosive round
- XM983 Infrared (IR) illumination round

== Operators ==
- Armenia: 12; M120 variant
- Bolivia: M120 variant
- Denmark: 20
- Georgia: 18
- Germany: M120R1 under license
- Iraq: 450; M120 variant
- Israel
- Kazakhstan M120 variant
- Kurdistan Region
- Latvia: 25; M120 variant
- Myanmar:80
- Poland: 142; M120 variant
- Ukraine: 30; M120 variant donated by the United States in response to the 2022 Russian invasion of Ukraine.
- United States: 1,076 M120 and M1064A3 variants as of January 2025

== See also ==
- 120 Krh/40 – The Finnish weapon that served as the basis for Soltam M-65 and K6
- Cardom 120 mm recoil mortar system
- M1064 mortar carrier – M113 series vehicle fitted with M121 120 mm mortar
- M1129 mortar carrier – Stryker series vehicle fitted with M121 120 mm mortar
- Soltam M-65 120 mm mortar
- M327 – 120 mm towed mortar used the USMC
- List of U.S. military vehicles by model number
