= M1064 mortar carrier =

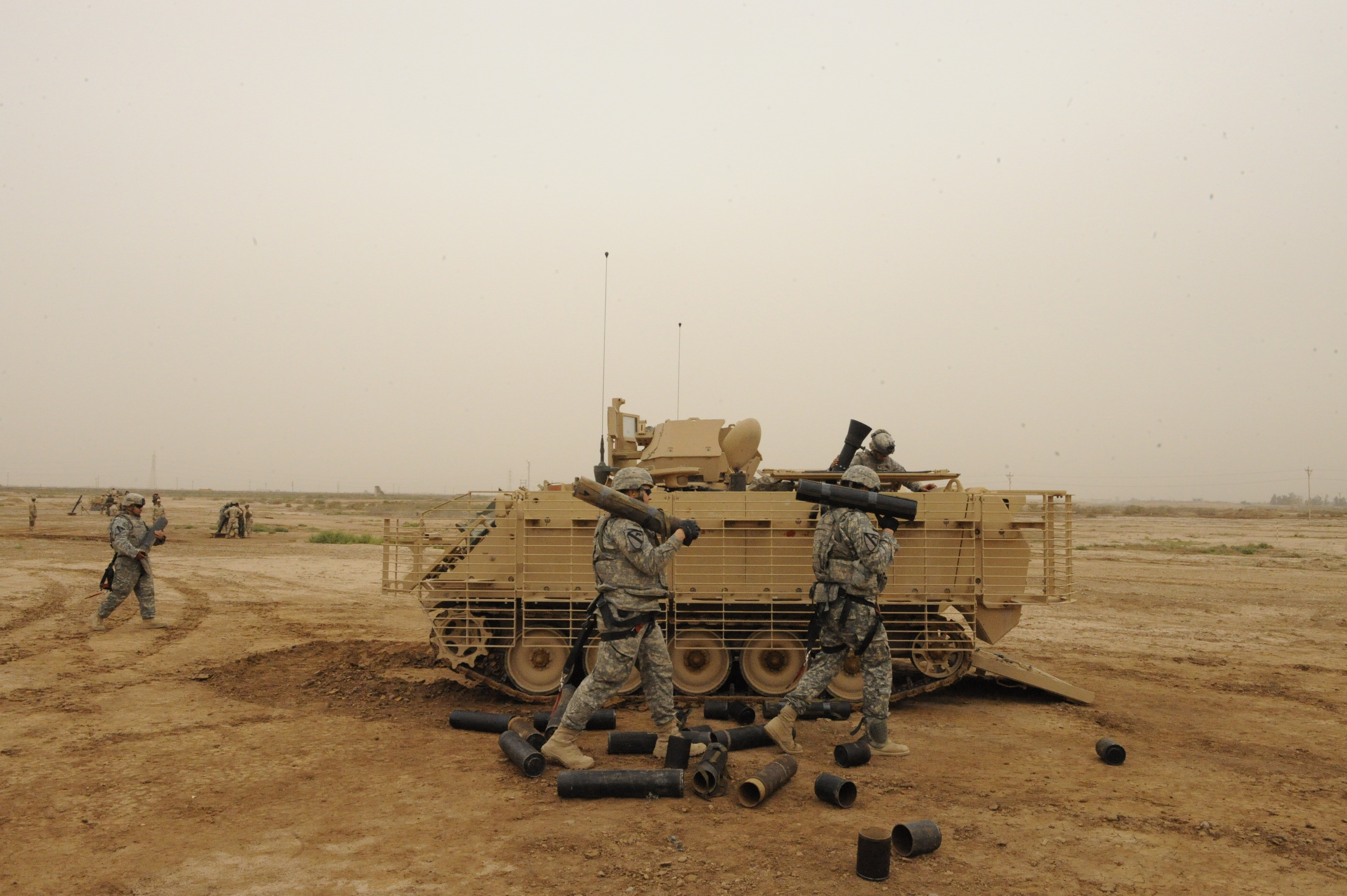
- M1064 mortar carrier, Iraq April 25, 2009
- Type: Mortar carrier
- Place of origin: United States

Service history
- In service: 1990–present
- Used by: United States, Egypt, Thailand

Specifications
- Mass: 14.1 short tons (12.8 t)
- Length: 17.45 feet (5.32 m)
- Width: 9.92 feet (3.02 m)
- Height: Chassis top:6 feet (1.8 m); Overall:8.19 feet (2.50 m)
- Crew: 4
- Armor: 5083 Aluminum
- Main armament: M120 mortar
- Secondary armament: M2 Browning
- Engine: Detroit Diesel 6V53T
- Transmission: Allison X200-4 series
- Ground clearance: 17 inches (43 cm)
- Fuel capacity: 95 US gallons (360 L)
- Operational range: 300 miles (480 km)

The M1064 mortar carrier is an American vehicle, consisting of the M121 mortar – a version of the M120 mortar – mounted on an M113 chassis. The M1287 mortar carrier vehicle will replace the M1064 in U.S. Army service.

== Design ==
The design consists of the M298 cannon, M191 bipod, M9 baseplate, and the carrier adaptation kit. With the use of an auxiliary M9 baseplate and extension feet for the M191 bipod, the M121 can be dismounted from the vehicle and emplaced for ground-mounted operations. The first M1064s were converted from M106 mortar carriers, whose 107 mm mortars had been replaced by the 120 mm mortars.

== Operators ==
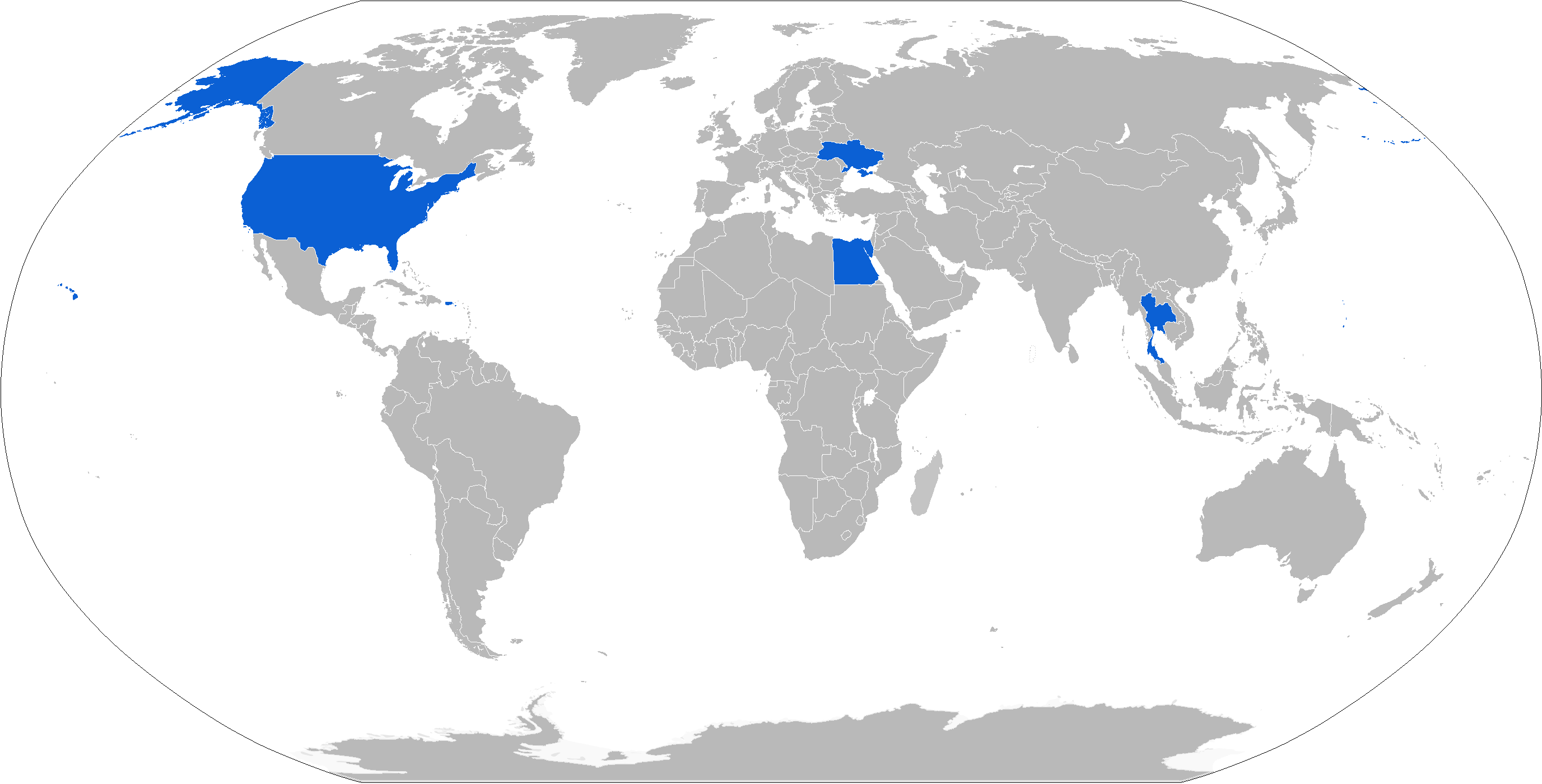
Map of M1064 mortar carrier operators in blue

=== Current operators ===
- Egypt: 36 M1064A3.
- Thailand: 12 M1064A3 ordered in 1995 and delivered in 1997.
- USA: 1076 M120/M1064A3
- Ukraine: Unknown number of M1064A3

== Gallery ==
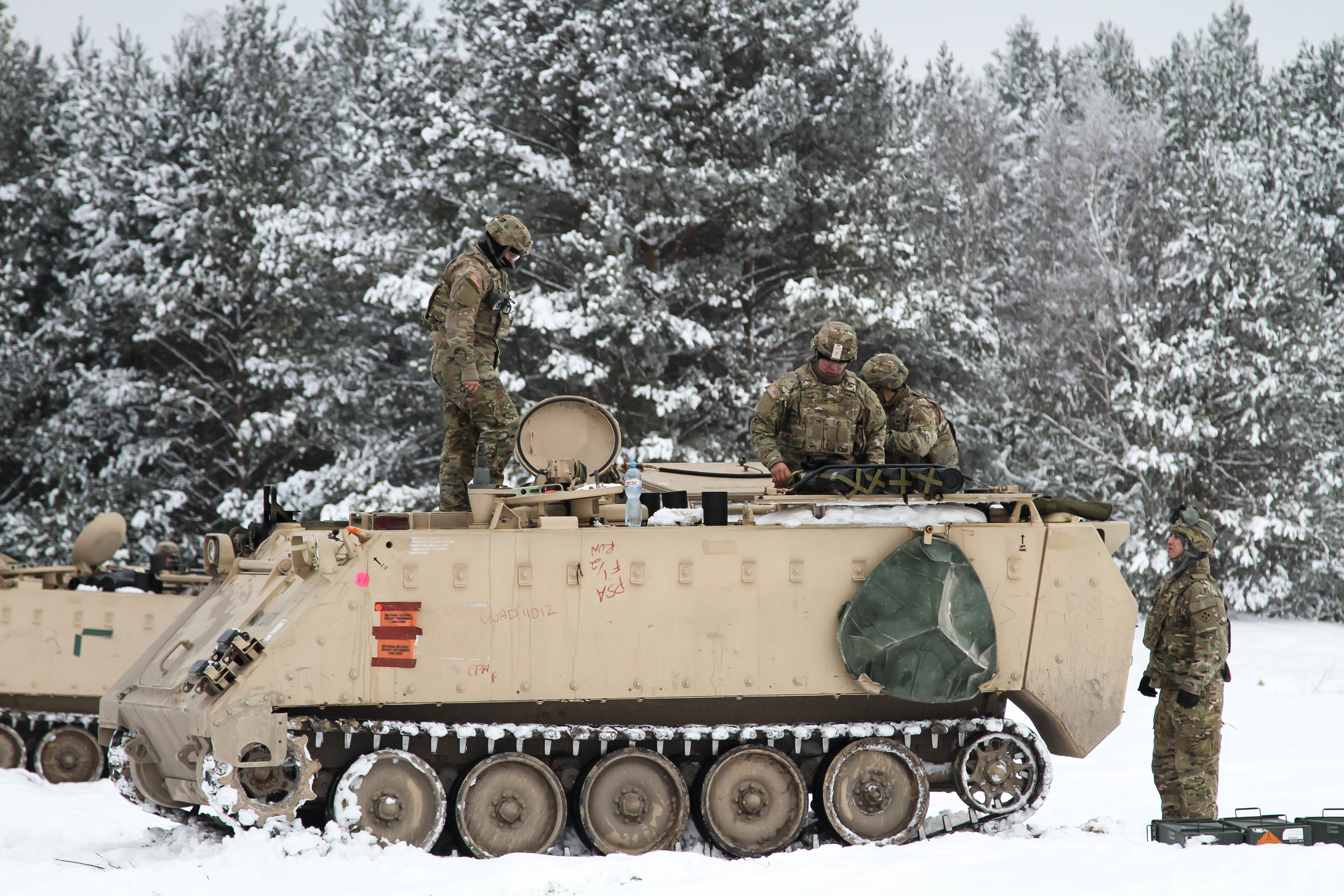

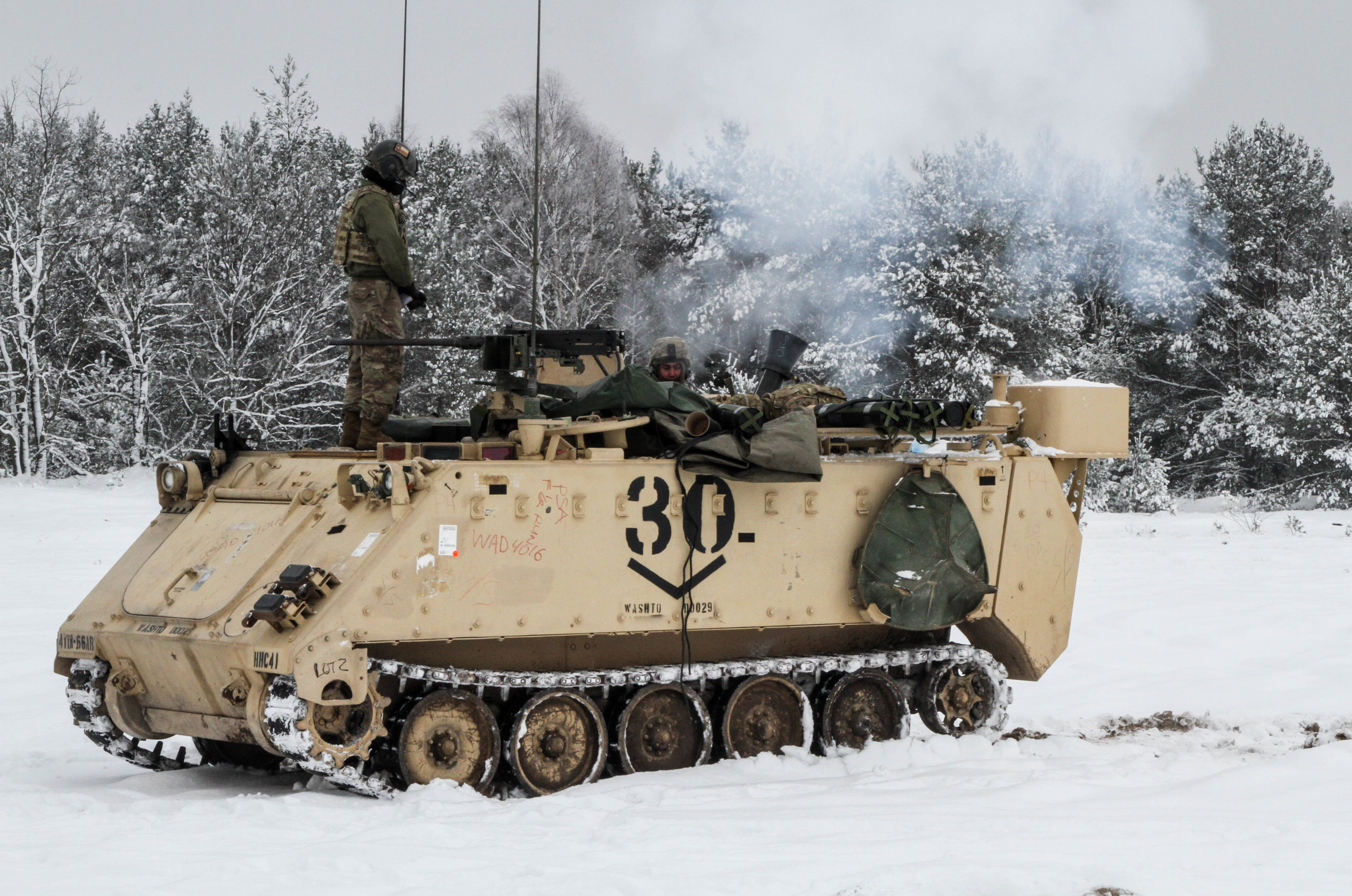

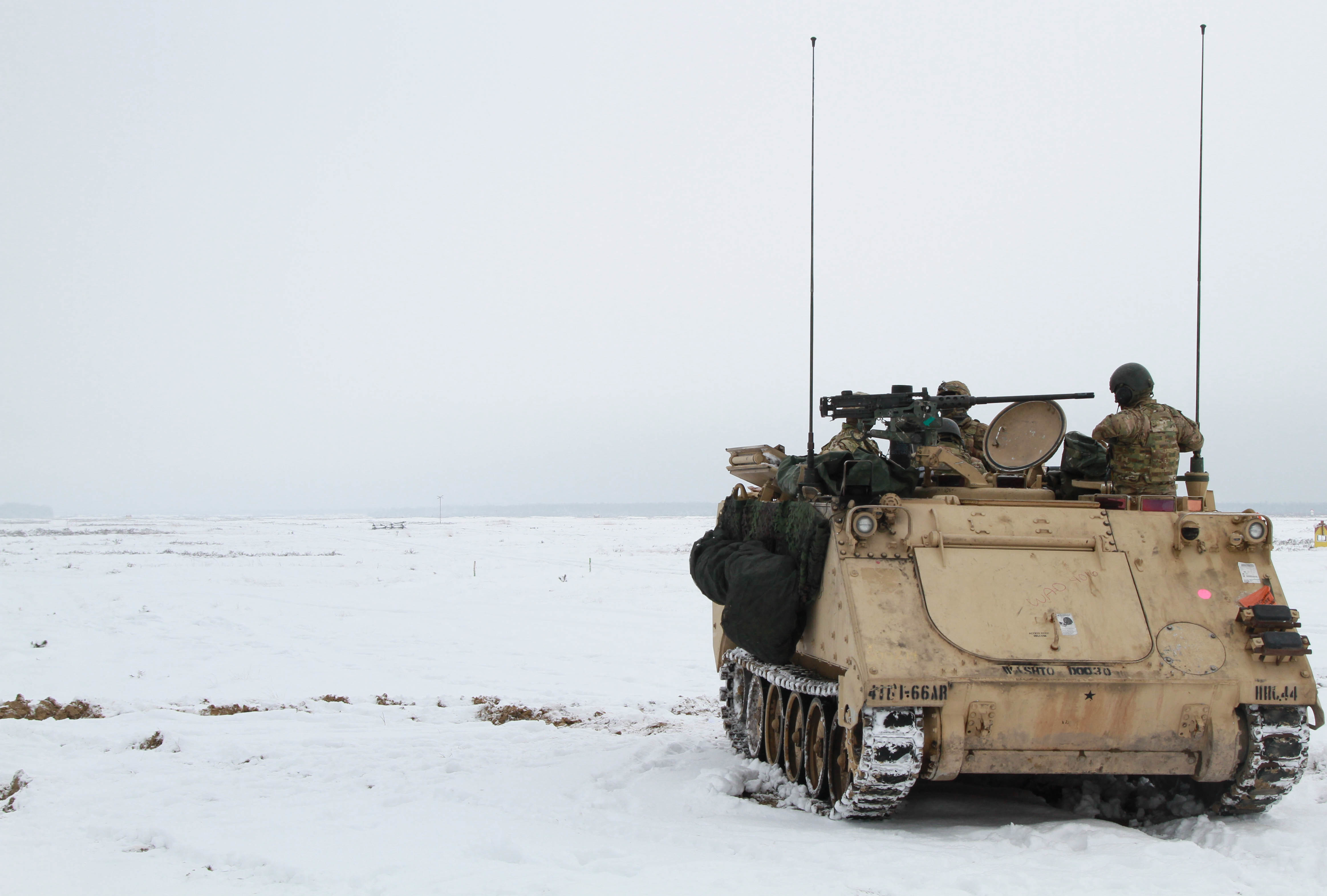

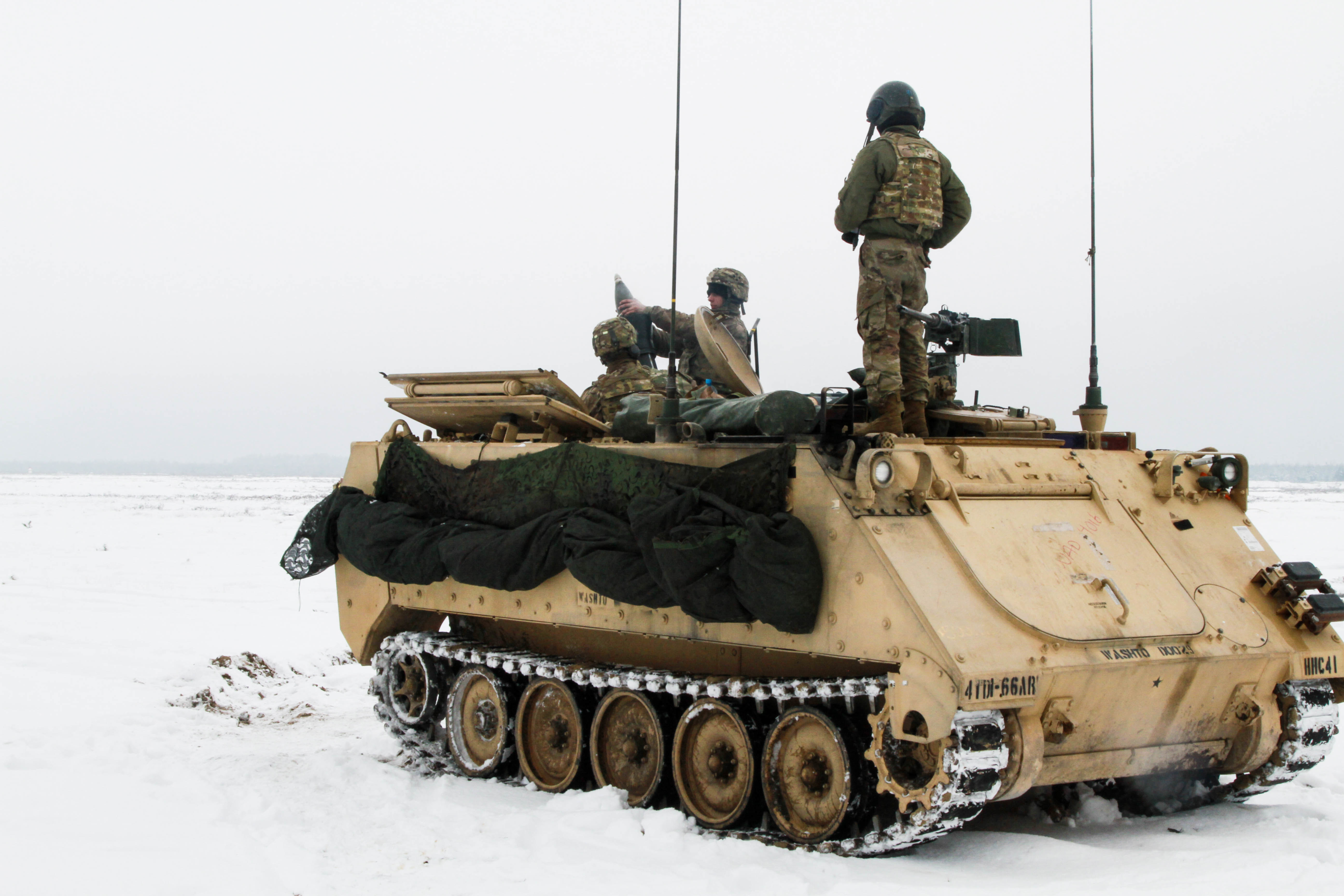

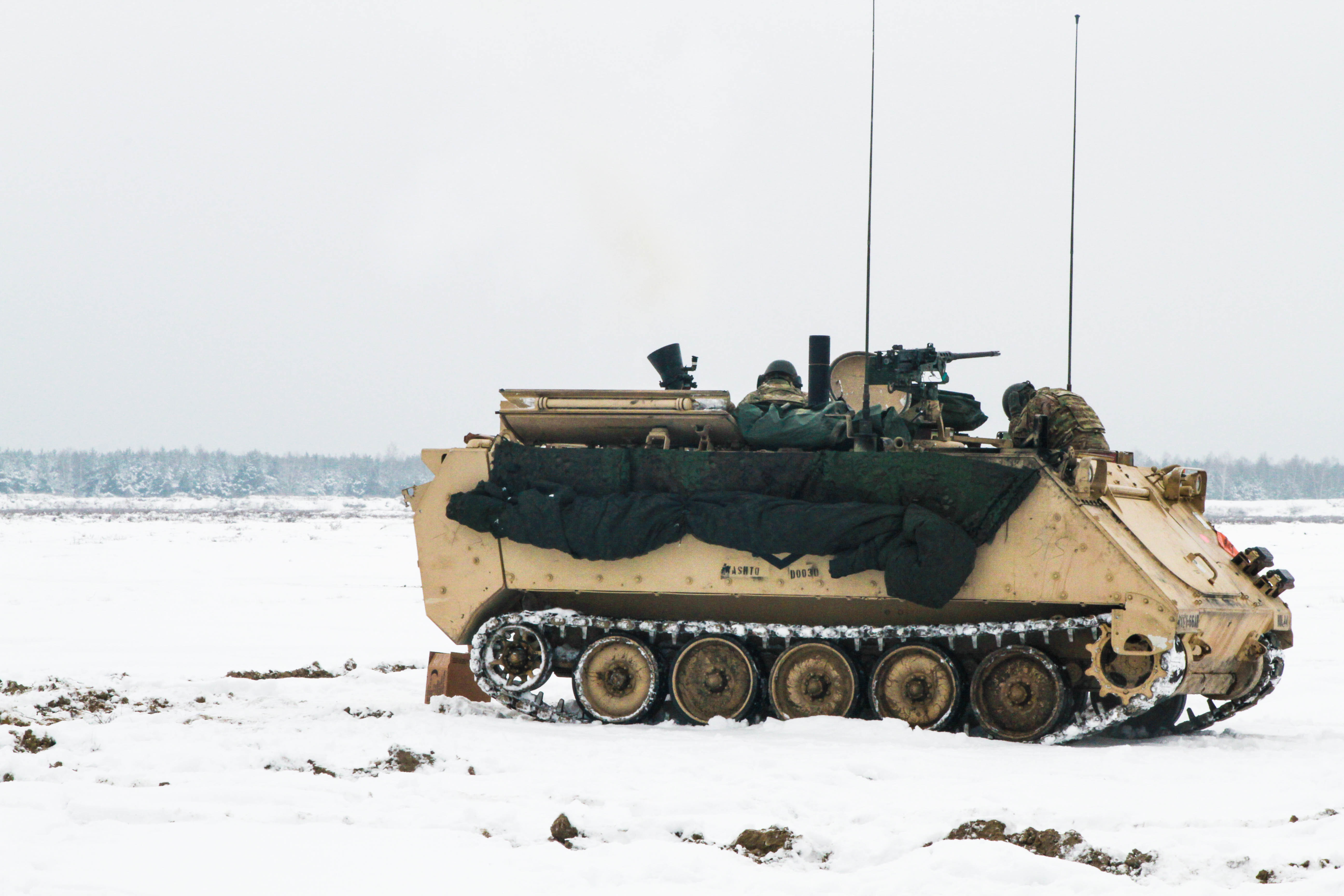

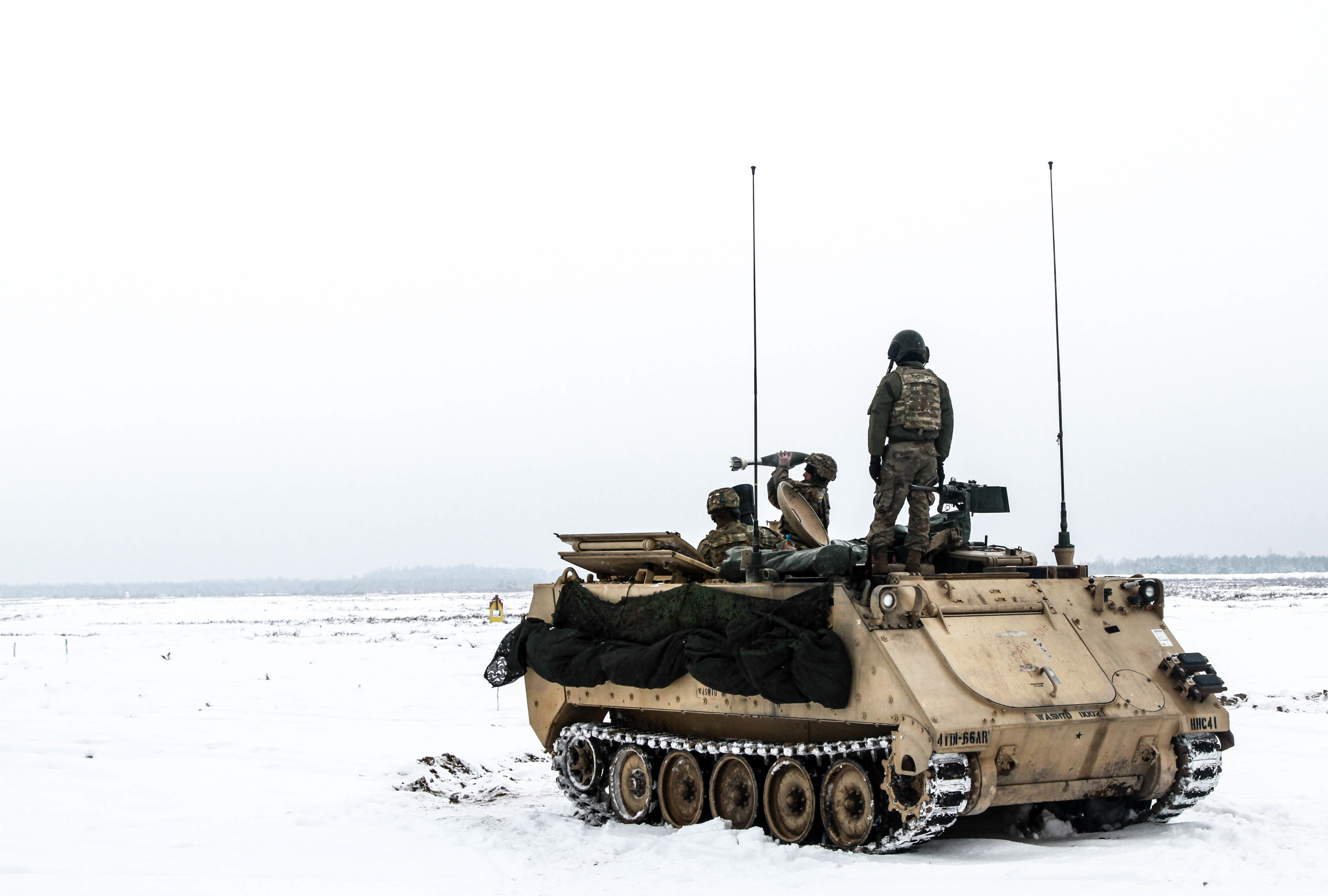

== See also ==
- M1129 mortar carrier, U.S. Army mortar carrier based on Stryker
- XM1204 Non-Line-of-Sight Mortar, U.S. Army Future Combat Systems mortar carrier canceled in 2009

== See also ==
- Variants of the M113 armored personnel carrier
