= 120 Krh/40 =

Finnish 120 mm heavy mortar

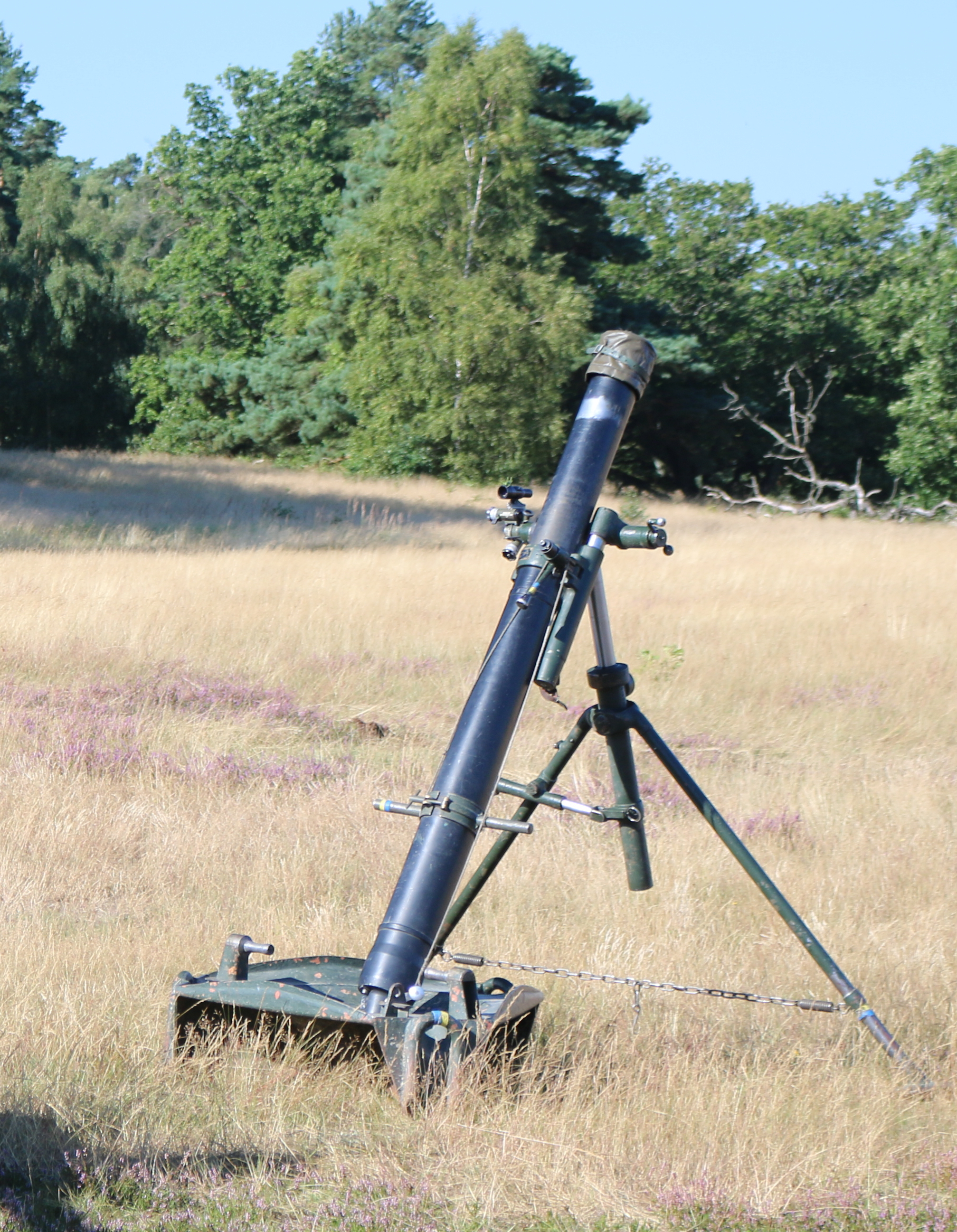
- Type: Heavy mortar
- Place of origin: Finland

Service history
- In service: 1940–present
- Used by: Finnish army Swedish army Estonian army German army Latvian army Lithuanian army Portuguese army
- Wars: Continuation War; Russian invasion of Ukraine

Production history
- Designer: Tampella
- Manufacturer: Tampella
- No. built: 596 by Tampella

Specifications
- Mass: 260 kg (570 lb)
- Barrel length: 189 cm (74 in)
- Caliber: 120 mm (4.7 in)
- Rate of fire: up to 20 rounds/minute
- Muzzle velocity: 116–290 m/s (380–950 ft/s)
- Maximum firing range: 7,200 metres (7,900 yd)

120 Krh/40 is a 120 mm mortar developed by the Finnish company Tampella (now Patria Vammas).

== Use in Sweden ==
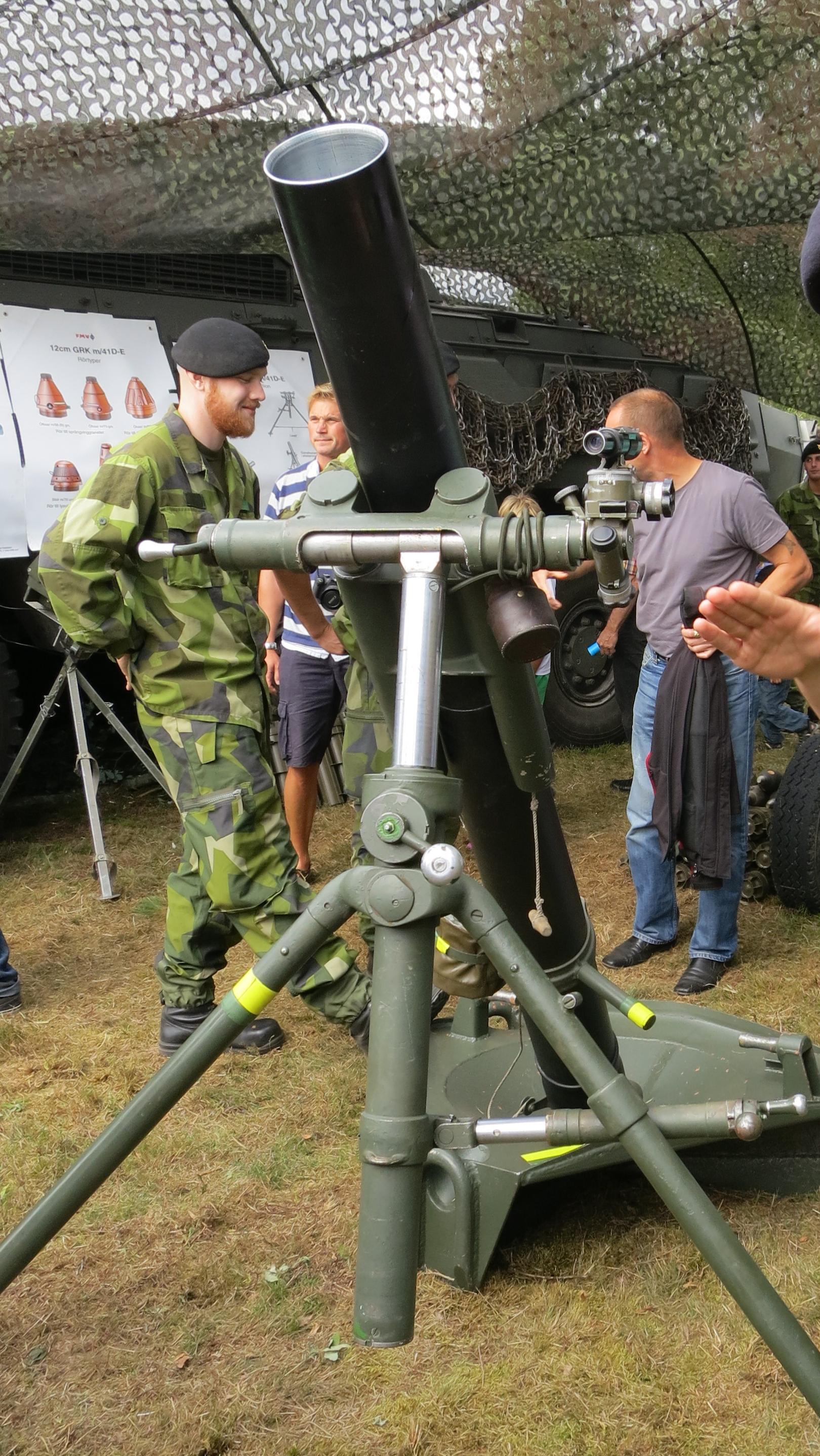
An m/41 mortar at a Regimental Day at the South Scanian Regiment.

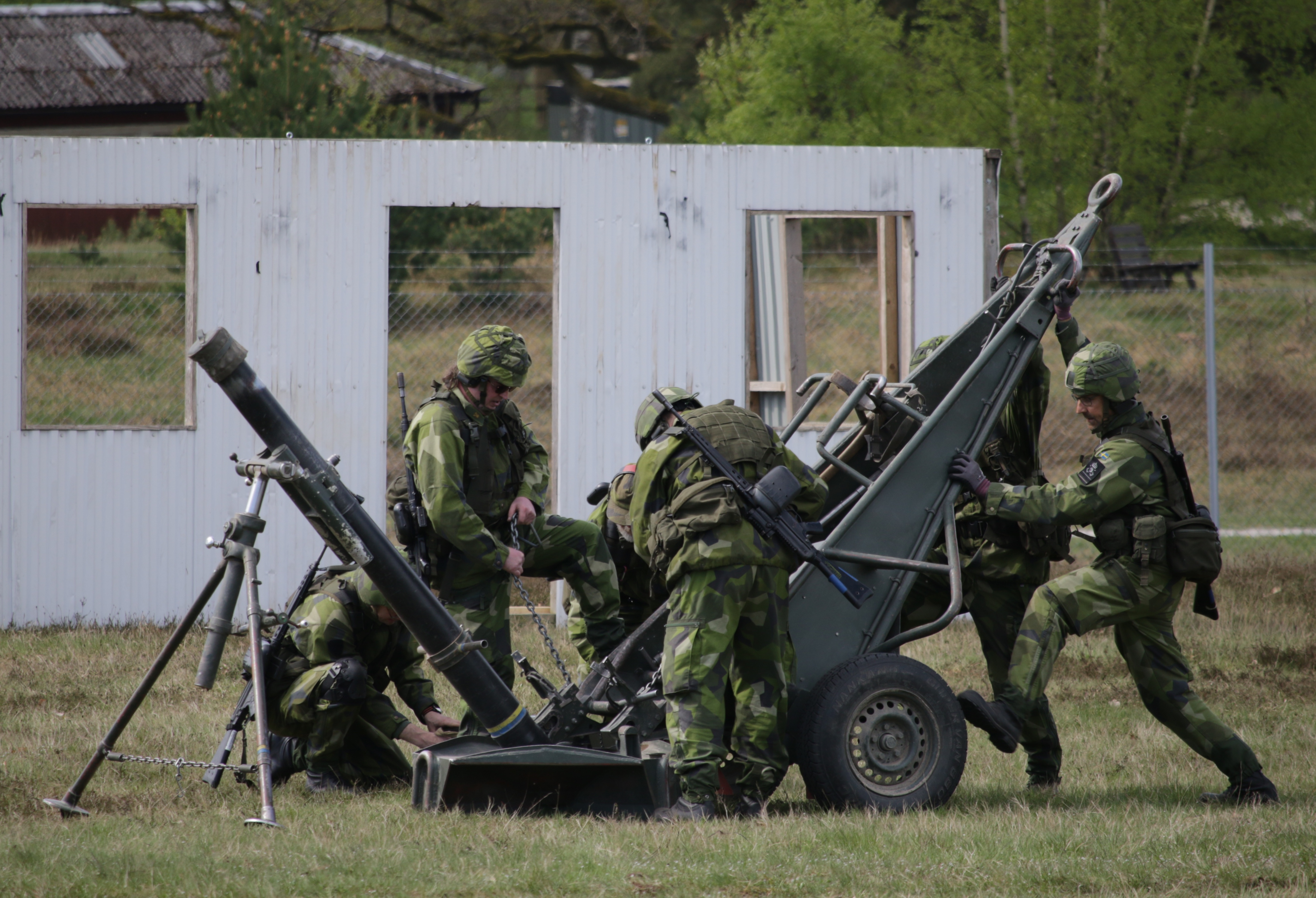
Loading the mortar into a cart.

The 120 Krh/40 first entered service in 1940 after being ordered the previous year by Finland. It was exported to Sweden between 1941 and 1944 and later produced under license there. A total of 219 were exported by Tampella. The Swedish military calls them 12 cm granatkastare m/41 and they have continued to serve as the standard heavy mortar of the Swedish Army. In 1956, their base-plates were replaced by Swedish-manufactured Hotchkiss-Brandt M-56 baseplates. As of 2016, 165 m/41D are still in service in the Estonian Land Forces and 22 are held by the Lithuanian Armed Forces.

They got a major increase in lethality when the STRIX top attack anti armour round was introduced in the 1990s; it is a smart weapon that homes in on the IR signature of armoured vehicles.

== See also ==
- Soltam M-65 – an Israeli copy of Krh/40 using a new base plate
- Soltam K6 – further development of M-65
